

80001–80100 

|-bgcolor=#d6d6d6
| 80001 ||  || — || March 20, 1999 || Socorro || LINEAR || — || align=right | 6.7 km || 
|-id=002 bgcolor=#E9E9E9
| 80002 ||  || — || March 20, 1999 || Socorro || LINEAR || — || align=right | 4.1 km || 
|-id=003 bgcolor=#d6d6d6
| 80003 ||  || — || March 20, 1999 || Socorro || LINEAR || — || align=right | 8.8 km || 
|-id=004 bgcolor=#d6d6d6
| 80004 ||  || — || March 20, 1999 || Socorro || LINEAR || — || align=right | 3.5 km || 
|-id=005 bgcolor=#d6d6d6
| 80005 ||  || — || March 20, 1999 || Socorro || LINEAR || — || align=right | 5.0 km || 
|-id=006 bgcolor=#E9E9E9
| 80006 ||  || — || March 20, 1999 || Socorro || LINEAR || — || align=right | 6.9 km || 
|-id=007 bgcolor=#d6d6d6
| 80007 ||  || — || March 22, 1999 || Anderson Mesa || LONEOS || HYG || align=right | 6.0 km || 
|-id=008 bgcolor=#d6d6d6
| 80008 Danielarhodes ||  ||  || April 4, 1999 || San Marcello || L. Tesi, A. Boattini || EOS || align=right | 5.0 km || 
|-id=009 bgcolor=#d6d6d6
| 80009 ||  || — || April 8, 1999 || Modra || L. Kornoš, A. Galád || EOS || align=right | 6.3 km || 
|-id=010 bgcolor=#d6d6d6
| 80010 ||  || — || April 9, 1999 || Oaxaca || J. M. Roe || EOS || align=right | 4.6 km || 
|-id=011 bgcolor=#d6d6d6
| 80011 ||  || — || April 7, 1999 || Kitt Peak || Spacewatch || KOR || align=right | 3.0 km || 
|-id=012 bgcolor=#d6d6d6
| 80012 ||  || — || April 11, 1999 || Fountain Hills || C. W. Juels || THM || align=right | 7.8 km || 
|-id=013 bgcolor=#d6d6d6
| 80013 ||  || — || April 15, 1999 || Kitt Peak || Spacewatch || — || align=right | 5.5 km || 
|-id=014 bgcolor=#d6d6d6
| 80014 ||  || — || April 9, 1999 || Socorro || LINEAR || EOS || align=right | 7.3 km || 
|-id=015 bgcolor=#d6d6d6
| 80015 ||  || — || April 15, 1999 || Socorro || LINEAR || — || align=right | 9.2 km || 
|-id=016 bgcolor=#fefefe
| 80016 ||  || — || April 10, 1999 || Socorro || LINEAR || — || align=right | 1.5 km || 
|-id=017 bgcolor=#E9E9E9
| 80017 ||  || — || April 12, 1999 || Socorro || LINEAR || — || align=right | 5.5 km || 
|-id=018 bgcolor=#d6d6d6
| 80018 ||  || — || April 12, 1999 || Socorro || LINEAR || — || align=right | 4.5 km || 
|-id=019 bgcolor=#fefefe
| 80019 ||  || — || April 23, 1999 || Višnjan Observatory || K. Korlević, M. Jurić || H || align=right | 2.1 km || 
|-id=020 bgcolor=#d6d6d6
| 80020 ||  || — || April 16, 1999 || Kitt Peak || Spacewatch || — || align=right | 4.8 km || 
|-id=021 bgcolor=#d6d6d6
| 80021 ||  || — || April 17, 1999 || Kitt Peak || Spacewatch || — || align=right | 8.2 km || 
|-id=022 bgcolor=#fefefe
| 80022 || 1999 JS || — || May 4, 1999 || Xinglong || SCAP || H || align=right | 1.9 km || 
|-id=023 bgcolor=#FA8072
| 80023 ||  || — || May 8, 1999 || Catalina || CSS || H || align=right | 1.5 km || 
|-id=024 bgcolor=#fefefe
| 80024 ||  || — || May 10, 1999 || Socorro || LINEAR || H || align=right | 1.4 km || 
|-id=025 bgcolor=#d6d6d6
| 80025 ||  || — || May 8, 1999 || Catalina || CSS || — || align=right | 6.2 km || 
|-id=026 bgcolor=#fefefe
| 80026 ||  || — || May 12, 1999 || Socorro || LINEAR || H || align=right | 2.3 km || 
|-id=027 bgcolor=#fefefe
| 80027 ||  || — || May 12, 1999 || Socorro || LINEAR || H || align=right | 1.3 km || 
|-id=028 bgcolor=#d6d6d6
| 80028 ||  || — || May 14, 1999 || Catalina || CSS || — || align=right | 5.5 km || 
|-id=029 bgcolor=#d6d6d6
| 80029 ||  || — || May 15, 1999 || Catalina || CSS || — || align=right | 5.8 km || 
|-id=030 bgcolor=#d6d6d6
| 80030 ||  || — || May 15, 1999 || Catalina || CSS || — || align=right | 6.8 km || 
|-id=031 bgcolor=#d6d6d6
| 80031 ||  || — || May 15, 1999 || Kitt Peak || Spacewatch || — || align=right | 8.0 km || 
|-id=032 bgcolor=#d6d6d6
| 80032 ||  || — || May 10, 1999 || Socorro || LINEAR || — || align=right | 5.8 km || 
|-id=033 bgcolor=#d6d6d6
| 80033 ||  || — || May 10, 1999 || Socorro || LINEAR || — || align=right | 5.3 km || 
|-id=034 bgcolor=#d6d6d6
| 80034 ||  || — || May 10, 1999 || Socorro || LINEAR || ALA || align=right | 11 km || 
|-id=035 bgcolor=#d6d6d6
| 80035 ||  || — || May 10, 1999 || Socorro || LINEAR || LIX || align=right | 11 km || 
|-id=036 bgcolor=#d6d6d6
| 80036 ||  || — || May 10, 1999 || Socorro || LINEAR || THM || align=right | 5.2 km || 
|-id=037 bgcolor=#d6d6d6
| 80037 ||  || — || May 10, 1999 || Socorro || LINEAR || — || align=right | 5.7 km || 
|-id=038 bgcolor=#d6d6d6
| 80038 ||  || — || May 10, 1999 || Socorro || LINEAR || — || align=right | 7.1 km || 
|-id=039 bgcolor=#d6d6d6
| 80039 ||  || — || May 10, 1999 || Socorro || LINEAR || HYG || align=right | 6.8 km || 
|-id=040 bgcolor=#d6d6d6
| 80040 ||  || — || May 10, 1999 || Socorro || LINEAR || — || align=right | 5.1 km || 
|-id=041 bgcolor=#d6d6d6
| 80041 ||  || — || May 10, 1999 || Socorro || LINEAR || — || align=right | 12 km || 
|-id=042 bgcolor=#d6d6d6
| 80042 ||  || — || May 10, 1999 || Socorro || LINEAR || — || align=right | 7.0 km || 
|-id=043 bgcolor=#d6d6d6
| 80043 ||  || — || May 10, 1999 || Socorro || LINEAR || — || align=right | 5.0 km || 
|-id=044 bgcolor=#d6d6d6
| 80044 ||  || — || May 10, 1999 || Socorro || LINEAR || — || align=right | 8.6 km || 
|-id=045 bgcolor=#d6d6d6
| 80045 ||  || — || May 10, 1999 || Socorro || LINEAR || VER || align=right | 6.1 km || 
|-id=046 bgcolor=#d6d6d6
| 80046 ||  || — || May 10, 1999 || Socorro || LINEAR || — || align=right | 7.5 km || 
|-id=047 bgcolor=#d6d6d6
| 80047 ||  || — || May 10, 1999 || Socorro || LINEAR || — || align=right | 9.0 km || 
|-id=048 bgcolor=#d6d6d6
| 80048 ||  || — || May 10, 1999 || Socorro || LINEAR || — || align=right | 3.6 km || 
|-id=049 bgcolor=#d6d6d6
| 80049 ||  || — || May 10, 1999 || Socorro || LINEAR || — || align=right | 6.7 km || 
|-id=050 bgcolor=#d6d6d6
| 80050 ||  || — || May 10, 1999 || Socorro || LINEAR || — || align=right | 6.5 km || 
|-id=051 bgcolor=#d6d6d6
| 80051 ||  || — || May 10, 1999 || Socorro || LINEAR || MEL || align=right | 11 km || 
|-id=052 bgcolor=#d6d6d6
| 80052 ||  || — || May 10, 1999 || Socorro || LINEAR || TIR || align=right | 4.1 km || 
|-id=053 bgcolor=#d6d6d6
| 80053 ||  || — || May 10, 1999 || Socorro || LINEAR || — || align=right | 8.1 km || 
|-id=054 bgcolor=#d6d6d6
| 80054 ||  || — || May 12, 1999 || Socorro || LINEAR || — || align=right | 5.5 km || 
|-id=055 bgcolor=#d6d6d6
| 80055 ||  || — || May 12, 1999 || Socorro || LINEAR || — || align=right | 6.8 km || 
|-id=056 bgcolor=#d6d6d6
| 80056 ||  || — || May 12, 1999 || Socorro || LINEAR || — || align=right | 3.8 km || 
|-id=057 bgcolor=#d6d6d6
| 80057 ||  || — || May 12, 1999 || Socorro || LINEAR || EOS || align=right | 5.7 km || 
|-id=058 bgcolor=#d6d6d6
| 80058 ||  || — || May 12, 1999 || Socorro || LINEAR || ALA || align=right | 9.4 km || 
|-id=059 bgcolor=#d6d6d6
| 80059 ||  || — || May 8, 1999 || Xinglong || SCAP || TIR || align=right | 4.0 km || 
|-id=060 bgcolor=#d6d6d6
| 80060 ||  || — || May 12, 1999 || Socorro || LINEAR || EMA || align=right | 8.6 km || 
|-id=061 bgcolor=#d6d6d6
| 80061 ||  || — || May 12, 1999 || Socorro || LINEAR || — || align=right | 4.8 km || 
|-id=062 bgcolor=#d6d6d6
| 80062 ||  || — || May 12, 1999 || Socorro || LINEAR || LIX || align=right | 9.5 km || 
|-id=063 bgcolor=#d6d6d6
| 80063 ||  || — || May 12, 1999 || Socorro || LINEAR || — || align=right | 6.4 km || 
|-id=064 bgcolor=#d6d6d6
| 80064 ||  || — || May 12, 1999 || Socorro || LINEAR || — || align=right | 3.8 km || 
|-id=065 bgcolor=#d6d6d6
| 80065 ||  || — || May 12, 1999 || Socorro || LINEAR || — || align=right | 4.8 km || 
|-id=066 bgcolor=#d6d6d6
| 80066 ||  || — || May 12, 1999 || Socorro || LINEAR || — || align=right | 7.9 km || 
|-id=067 bgcolor=#d6d6d6
| 80067 ||  || — || May 12, 1999 || Socorro || LINEAR || — || align=right | 5.7 km || 
|-id=068 bgcolor=#d6d6d6
| 80068 ||  || — || May 12, 1999 || Socorro || LINEAR || TIR || align=right | 4.1 km || 
|-id=069 bgcolor=#d6d6d6
| 80069 ||  || — || May 12, 1999 || Socorro || LINEAR || — || align=right | 4.4 km || 
|-id=070 bgcolor=#d6d6d6
| 80070 ||  || — || May 12, 1999 || Socorro || LINEAR || EMA || align=right | 7.8 km || 
|-id=071 bgcolor=#d6d6d6
| 80071 ||  || — || May 12, 1999 || Socorro || LINEAR || — || align=right | 8.6 km || 
|-id=072 bgcolor=#d6d6d6
| 80072 ||  || — || May 12, 1999 || Socorro || LINEAR || — || align=right | 6.4 km || 
|-id=073 bgcolor=#d6d6d6
| 80073 ||  || — || May 12, 1999 || Socorro || LINEAR || — || align=right | 7.4 km || 
|-id=074 bgcolor=#d6d6d6
| 80074 ||  || — || May 12, 1999 || Socorro || LINEAR || — || align=right | 4.6 km || 
|-id=075 bgcolor=#d6d6d6
| 80075 ||  || — || May 12, 1999 || Socorro || LINEAR || — || align=right | 7.5 km || 
|-id=076 bgcolor=#d6d6d6
| 80076 ||  || — || May 13, 1999 || Socorro || LINEAR || — || align=right | 15 km || 
|-id=077 bgcolor=#d6d6d6
| 80077 ||  || — || May 13, 1999 || Socorro || LINEAR || — || align=right | 4.8 km || 
|-id=078 bgcolor=#d6d6d6
| 80078 ||  || — || May 13, 1999 || Socorro || LINEAR || — || align=right | 6.1 km || 
|-id=079 bgcolor=#d6d6d6
| 80079 ||  || — || May 13, 1999 || Socorro || LINEAR || — || align=right | 8.2 km || 
|-id=080 bgcolor=#d6d6d6
| 80080 ||  || — || May 10, 1999 || Socorro || LINEAR || HYG || align=right | 6.9 km || 
|-id=081 bgcolor=#d6d6d6
| 80081 ||  || — || May 13, 1999 || Socorro || LINEAR || — || align=right | 6.5 km || 
|-id=082 bgcolor=#d6d6d6
| 80082 ||  || — || May 13, 1999 || Socorro || LINEAR || — || align=right | 6.0 km || 
|-id=083 bgcolor=#d6d6d6
| 80083 ||  || — || May 16, 1999 || Kitt Peak || Spacewatch || — || align=right | 5.1 km || 
|-id=084 bgcolor=#d6d6d6
| 80084 ||  || — || May 23, 1999 || Woomera || F. B. Zoltowski || — || align=right | 5.8 km || 
|-id=085 bgcolor=#d6d6d6
| 80085 ||  || — || May 17, 1999 || Socorro || LINEAR || TIR || align=right | 4.5 km || 
|-id=086 bgcolor=#d6d6d6
| 80086 ||  || — || May 17, 1999 || Socorro || LINEAR || — || align=right | 8.2 km || 
|-id=087 bgcolor=#d6d6d6
| 80087 ||  || — || May 18, 1999 || Socorro || LINEAR || — || align=right | 7.6 km || 
|-id=088 bgcolor=#d6d6d6
| 80088 ||  || — || May 18, 1999 || Socorro || LINEAR || — || align=right | 9.5 km || 
|-id=089 bgcolor=#fefefe
| 80089 || 1999 LR || — || June 4, 1999 || Socorro || LINEAR || H || align=right | 2.8 km || 
|-id=090 bgcolor=#d6d6d6
| 80090 ||  || — || June 6, 1999 || Kitt Peak || Spacewatch || — || align=right | 5.6 km || 
|-id=091 bgcolor=#fefefe
| 80091 ||  || — || June 11, 1999 || Socorro || LINEAR || H || align=right | 1.4 km || 
|-id=092 bgcolor=#d6d6d6
| 80092 ||  || — || June 8, 1999 || Socorro || LINEAR || VER || align=right | 6.2 km || 
|-id=093 bgcolor=#fefefe
| 80093 ||  || — || June 9, 1999 || Socorro || LINEAR || H || align=right | 1.8 km || 
|-id=094 bgcolor=#d6d6d6
| 80094 ||  || — || June 9, 1999 || Socorro || LINEAR || — || align=right | 9.6 km || 
|-id=095 bgcolor=#d6d6d6
| 80095 ||  || — || June 12, 1999 || Socorro || LINEAR || — || align=right | 7.0 km || 
|-id=096 bgcolor=#fefefe
| 80096 ||  || — || June 9, 1999 || Kitt Peak || Spacewatch || H || align=right | 1.2 km || 
|-id=097 bgcolor=#d6d6d6
| 80097 ||  || — || June 14, 1999 || Socorro || LINEAR || VER || align=right | 6.0 km || 
|-id=098 bgcolor=#FA8072
| 80098 ||  || — || June 20, 1999 || Anderson Mesa || LONEOS || — || align=right | 1.6 km || 
|-id=099 bgcolor=#fefefe
| 80099 || 1999 NR || — || July 8, 1999 || Catalina || CSS || H || align=right | 1.0 km || 
|-id=100 bgcolor=#fefefe
| 80100 || 1999 NS || — || July 8, 1999 || Catalina || CSS || H || align=right | 1.7 km || 
|}

80101–80200 

|-bgcolor=#fefefe
| 80101 ||  || — || July 13, 1999 || Socorro || LINEAR || H || align=right | 2.0 km || 
|-id=102 bgcolor=#d6d6d6
| 80102 ||  || — || July 14, 1999 || Socorro || LINEAR || — || align=right | 4.4 km || 
|-id=103 bgcolor=#fefefe
| 80103 || 1999 PA || — || August 2, 1999 || Gekko || T. Kagawa || — || align=right | 1.7 km || 
|-id=104 bgcolor=#fefefe
| 80104 ||  || — || September 7, 1999 || Socorro || LINEAR || — || align=right | 1.6 km || 
|-id=105 bgcolor=#fefefe
| 80105 ||  || — || September 7, 1999 || Socorro || LINEAR || FLO || align=right | 1.3 km || 
|-id=106 bgcolor=#fefefe
| 80106 ||  || — || September 7, 1999 || Socorro || LINEAR || — || align=right | 1.2 km || 
|-id=107 bgcolor=#FA8072
| 80107 ||  || — || September 8, 1999 || Socorro || LINEAR || — || align=right | 2.1 km || 
|-id=108 bgcolor=#fefefe
| 80108 ||  || — || September 8, 1999 || Socorro || LINEAR || H || align=right | 1.4 km || 
|-id=109 bgcolor=#fefefe
| 80109 ||  || — || September 10, 1999 || Socorro || LINEAR || H || align=right | 1.5 km || 
|-id=110 bgcolor=#fefefe
| 80110 ||  || — || September 7, 1999 || Socorro || LINEAR || — || align=right | 1.2 km || 
|-id=111 bgcolor=#fefefe
| 80111 ||  || — || September 13, 1999 || Višnjan Observatory || K. Korlević || PHO || align=right | 4.2 km || 
|-id=112 bgcolor=#fefefe
| 80112 ||  || — || September 7, 1999 || Socorro || LINEAR || — || align=right | 1.4 km || 
|-id=113 bgcolor=#fefefe
| 80113 ||  || — || September 7, 1999 || Socorro || LINEAR || MAS || align=right | 1.5 km || 
|-id=114 bgcolor=#fefefe
| 80114 ||  || — || September 7, 1999 || Socorro || LINEAR || — || align=right | 1.8 km || 
|-id=115 bgcolor=#fefefe
| 80115 ||  || — || September 7, 1999 || Socorro || LINEAR || — || align=right | 1.9 km || 
|-id=116 bgcolor=#fefefe
| 80116 ||  || — || September 8, 1999 || Socorro || LINEAR || — || align=right | 1.7 km || 
|-id=117 bgcolor=#d6d6d6
| 80117 ||  || — || September 9, 1999 || Socorro || LINEAR || TIR || align=right | 4.0 km || 
|-id=118 bgcolor=#fefefe
| 80118 ||  || — || September 9, 1999 || Socorro || LINEAR || — || align=right | 2.1 km || 
|-id=119 bgcolor=#C2FFFF
| 80119 ||  || — || September 9, 1999 || Socorro || LINEAR || L5 || align=right | 28 km || 
|-id=120 bgcolor=#fefefe
| 80120 ||  || — || September 9, 1999 || Socorro || LINEAR || — || align=right | 1.4 km || 
|-id=121 bgcolor=#d6d6d6
| 80121 ||  || — || September 9, 1999 || Socorro || LINEAR || — || align=right | 8.4 km || 
|-id=122 bgcolor=#fefefe
| 80122 ||  || — || September 9, 1999 || Socorro || LINEAR || FLO || align=right | 1.5 km || 
|-id=123 bgcolor=#fefefe
| 80123 ||  || — || September 9, 1999 || Socorro || LINEAR || — || align=right | 1.4 km || 
|-id=124 bgcolor=#fefefe
| 80124 ||  || — || September 9, 1999 || Socorro || LINEAR || — || align=right | 1.2 km || 
|-id=125 bgcolor=#fefefe
| 80125 ||  || — || September 9, 1999 || Socorro || LINEAR || — || align=right | 1.9 km || 
|-id=126 bgcolor=#fefefe
| 80126 ||  || — || September 10, 1999 || Socorro || LINEAR || — || align=right | 1.5 km || 
|-id=127 bgcolor=#fefefe
| 80127 ||  || — || September 9, 1999 || Socorro || LINEAR || — || align=right | 1.6 km || 
|-id=128 bgcolor=#fefefe
| 80128 ||  || — || September 8, 1999 || Socorro || LINEAR || — || align=right | 1.9 km || 
|-id=129 bgcolor=#fefefe
| 80129 ||  || — || September 7, 1999 || Socorro || LINEAR || — || align=right | 2.1 km || 
|-id=130 bgcolor=#fefefe
| 80130 ||  || — || September 18, 1999 || Socorro || LINEAR || H || align=right | 1.8 km || 
|-id=131 bgcolor=#fefefe
| 80131 ||  || — || September 30, 1999 || Socorro || LINEAR || PHO || align=right | 3.2 km || 
|-id=132 bgcolor=#fefefe
| 80132 ||  || — || September 30, 1999 || Catalina || CSS || — || align=right | 1.4 km || 
|-id=133 bgcolor=#fefefe
| 80133 ||  || — || September 30, 1999 || Catalina || CSS || FLO || align=right | 2.0 km || 
|-id=134 bgcolor=#fefefe
| 80134 ||  || — || October 5, 1999 || Fountain Hills || C. W. Juels || — || align=right | 1.7 km || 
|-id=135 bgcolor=#fefefe
| 80135 Zanzanini ||  ||  || October 7, 1999 || Gnosca || S. Sposetti || — || align=right | 2.1 km || 
|-id=136 bgcolor=#fefefe
| 80136 ||  || — || October 3, 1999 || Kitt Peak || Spacewatch || — || align=right | 1.3 km || 
|-id=137 bgcolor=#fefefe
| 80137 ||  || — || October 3, 1999 || Socorro || LINEAR || — || align=right | 1.9 km || 
|-id=138 bgcolor=#fefefe
| 80138 ||  || — || October 10, 1999 || Xinglong || SCAP || — || align=right | 1.4 km || 
|-id=139 bgcolor=#fefefe
| 80139 ||  || — || October 3, 1999 || Kitt Peak || Spacewatch || — || align=right | 1.4 km || 
|-id=140 bgcolor=#fefefe
| 80140 ||  || — || October 6, 1999 || Kitt Peak || Spacewatch || — || align=right | 1.0 km || 
|-id=141 bgcolor=#fefefe
| 80141 ||  || — || October 8, 1999 || Kitt Peak || Spacewatch || — || align=right | 1.2 km || 
|-id=142 bgcolor=#fefefe
| 80142 ||  || — || October 2, 1999 || Socorro || LINEAR || — || align=right | 1.5 km || 
|-id=143 bgcolor=#fefefe
| 80143 ||  || — || October 2, 1999 || Socorro || LINEAR || — || align=right | 1.4 km || 
|-id=144 bgcolor=#fefefe
| 80144 ||  || — || October 4, 1999 || Socorro || LINEAR || — || align=right | 1.6 km || 
|-id=145 bgcolor=#fefefe
| 80145 ||  || — || October 7, 1999 || Socorro || LINEAR || — || align=right | 1.3 km || 
|-id=146 bgcolor=#fefefe
| 80146 ||  || — || October 7, 1999 || Socorro || LINEAR || — || align=right | 1.5 km || 
|-id=147 bgcolor=#fefefe
| 80147 ||  || — || October 10, 1999 || Socorro || LINEAR || NYS || align=right | 1.4 km || 
|-id=148 bgcolor=#fefefe
| 80148 ||  || — || October 10, 1999 || Socorro || LINEAR || NYS || align=right | 1.4 km || 
|-id=149 bgcolor=#fefefe
| 80149 ||  || — || October 10, 1999 || Socorro || LINEAR || — || align=right | 1.7 km || 
|-id=150 bgcolor=#fefefe
| 80150 ||  || — || October 10, 1999 || Socorro || LINEAR || — || align=right | 1.3 km || 
|-id=151 bgcolor=#fefefe
| 80151 ||  || — || October 10, 1999 || Socorro || LINEAR || — || align=right | 2.8 km || 
|-id=152 bgcolor=#fefefe
| 80152 ||  || — || October 12, 1999 || Socorro || LINEAR || — || align=right | 1.6 km || 
|-id=153 bgcolor=#fefefe
| 80153 ||  || — || October 12, 1999 || Socorro || LINEAR || FLO || align=right | 1.8 km || 
|-id=154 bgcolor=#fefefe
| 80154 ||  || — || October 12, 1999 || Socorro || LINEAR || — || align=right | 3.3 km || 
|-id=155 bgcolor=#fefefe
| 80155 ||  || — || October 13, 1999 || Socorro || LINEAR || FLO || align=right | 1.3 km || 
|-id=156 bgcolor=#fefefe
| 80156 ||  || — || October 15, 1999 || Socorro || LINEAR || — || align=right | 1.5 km || 
|-id=157 bgcolor=#fefefe
| 80157 ||  || — || October 15, 1999 || Socorro || LINEAR || NYS || align=right | 1.3 km || 
|-id=158 bgcolor=#fefefe
| 80158 ||  || — || October 2, 1999 || Socorro || LINEAR || — || align=right | 3.7 km || 
|-id=159 bgcolor=#fefefe
| 80159 ||  || — || October 5, 1999 || Catalina || CSS || — || align=right | 1.6 km || 
|-id=160 bgcolor=#fefefe
| 80160 ||  || — || October 4, 1999 || Catalina || CSS || — || align=right | 1.8 km || 
|-id=161 bgcolor=#fefefe
| 80161 ||  || — || October 8, 1999 || Catalina || CSS || — || align=right | 1.4 km || 
|-id=162 bgcolor=#fefefe
| 80162 ||  || — || October 8, 1999 || Catalina || CSS || FLO || align=right | 1.3 km || 
|-id=163 bgcolor=#fefefe
| 80163 ||  || — || October 9, 1999 || Socorro || LINEAR || FLO || align=right | 1.5 km || 
|-id=164 bgcolor=#fefefe
| 80164 ||  || — || October 3, 1999 || Socorro || LINEAR || H || align=right | 1.5 km || 
|-id=165 bgcolor=#fefefe
| 80165 ||  || — || October 9, 1999 || Socorro || LINEAR || — || align=right | 1.5 km || 
|-id=166 bgcolor=#fefefe
| 80166 ||  || — || October 10, 1999 || Socorro || LINEAR || — || align=right | 1.7 km || 
|-id=167 bgcolor=#fefefe
| 80167 ||  || — || October 12, 1999 || Socorro || LINEAR || — || align=right | 3.6 km || 
|-id=168 bgcolor=#fefefe
| 80168 ||  || — || October 10, 1999 || Socorro || LINEAR || — || align=right | 1.7 km || 
|-id=169 bgcolor=#fefefe
| 80169 ||  || — || October 12, 1999 || Socorro || LINEAR || — || align=right | 1.8 km || 
|-id=170 bgcolor=#fefefe
| 80170 ||  || — || October 29, 1999 || Catalina || CSS || — || align=right | 1.4 km || 
|-id=171 bgcolor=#fefefe
| 80171 ||  || — || October 28, 1999 || Xinglong || SCAP || — || align=right | 1.8 km || 
|-id=172 bgcolor=#fefefe
| 80172 ||  || — || October 29, 1999 || Catalina || CSS || — || align=right | 1.3 km || 
|-id=173 bgcolor=#fefefe
| 80173 ||  || — || October 29, 1999 || Catalina || CSS || fast? || align=right | 2.2 km || 
|-id=174 bgcolor=#fefefe
| 80174 ||  || — || October 28, 1999 || Catalina || CSS || — || align=right | 3.9 km || 
|-id=175 bgcolor=#fefefe
| 80175 ||  || — || October 30, 1999 || Catalina || CSS || — || align=right | 2.0 km || 
|-id=176 bgcolor=#fefefe
| 80176 ||  || — || October 29, 1999 || Anderson Mesa || LONEOS || FLO || align=right | 1.5 km || 
|-id=177 bgcolor=#fefefe
| 80177 ||  || — || October 28, 1999 || Catalina || CSS || — || align=right | 1.6 km || 
|-id=178 bgcolor=#fefefe
| 80178 ||  || — || October 30, 1999 || Catalina || CSS || NYS || align=right | 1.2 km || 
|-id=179 bgcolor=#fefefe
| 80179 Václavknoll || 1999 VK ||  || November 1, 1999 || Ondřejov || L. Kotková || — || align=right | 2.0 km || 
|-id=180 bgcolor=#fefefe
| 80180 Elko || 1999 VS ||  || November 3, 1999 || Wiggins Observatory || P. Wiggins, H. Phaneuf || V || align=right | 1.5 km || 
|-id=181 bgcolor=#fefefe
| 80181 ||  || — || November 7, 1999 || Višnjan Observatory || K. Korlević || FLO || align=right | 1.5 km || 
|-id=182 bgcolor=#fefefe
| 80182 ||  || — || November 1, 1999 || Socorro || LINEAR || PHO || align=right | 3.4 km || 
|-id=183 bgcolor=#fefefe
| 80183 ||  || — || November 9, 1999 || Nachi-Katsuura || Y. Shimizu, T. Urata || — || align=right | 5.3 km || 
|-id=184 bgcolor=#fefefe
| 80184 Hekigoto ||  ||  || November 10, 1999 || Kuma Kogen || A. Nakamura || — || align=right | 1.4 km || 
|-id=185 bgcolor=#fefefe
| 80185 ||  || — || November 3, 1999 || Socorro || LINEAR || FLO || align=right | 4.2 km || 
|-id=186 bgcolor=#fefefe
| 80186 ||  || — || November 3, 1999 || Socorro || LINEAR || V || align=right | 1.1 km || 
|-id=187 bgcolor=#E9E9E9
| 80187 ||  || — || November 3, 1999 || Socorro || LINEAR || — || align=right | 2.8 km || 
|-id=188 bgcolor=#fefefe
| 80188 ||  || — || November 3, 1999 || Socorro || LINEAR || — || align=right | 1.7 km || 
|-id=189 bgcolor=#fefefe
| 80189 ||  || — || November 3, 1999 || Socorro || LINEAR || — || align=right | 1.7 km || 
|-id=190 bgcolor=#fefefe
| 80190 ||  || — || November 10, 1999 || Socorro || LINEAR || — || align=right | 3.4 km || 
|-id=191 bgcolor=#fefefe
| 80191 ||  || — || November 10, 1999 || Socorro || LINEAR || — || align=right | 1.5 km || 
|-id=192 bgcolor=#fefefe
| 80192 ||  || — || November 10, 1999 || Socorro || LINEAR || — || align=right | 1.3 km || 
|-id=193 bgcolor=#fefefe
| 80193 ||  || — || November 1, 1999 || Catalina || CSS || — || align=right | 1.3 km || 
|-id=194 bgcolor=#fefefe
| 80194 ||  || — || November 3, 1999 || Catalina || CSS || — || align=right | 1.5 km || 
|-id=195 bgcolor=#fefefe
| 80195 ||  || — || November 4, 1999 || Catalina || CSS || — || align=right | 1.7 km || 
|-id=196 bgcolor=#fefefe
| 80196 ||  || — || November 3, 1999 || Socorro || LINEAR || — || align=right | 2.2 km || 
|-id=197 bgcolor=#fefefe
| 80197 ||  || — || November 3, 1999 || Socorro || LINEAR || FLO || align=right | 1.2 km || 
|-id=198 bgcolor=#fefefe
| 80198 ||  || — || November 3, 1999 || Socorro || LINEAR || FLO || align=right | 1.3 km || 
|-id=199 bgcolor=#fefefe
| 80199 ||  || — || November 3, 1999 || Socorro || LINEAR || FLO || align=right | 1.6 km || 
|-id=200 bgcolor=#fefefe
| 80200 ||  || — || November 4, 1999 || Socorro || LINEAR || — || align=right | 1.8 km || 
|}

80201–80300 

|-bgcolor=#fefefe
| 80201 ||  || — || November 4, 1999 || Socorro || LINEAR || EUT || align=right | 1.0 km || 
|-id=202 bgcolor=#fefefe
| 80202 ||  || — || November 4, 1999 || Socorro || LINEAR || FLO || align=right | 1.3 km || 
|-id=203 bgcolor=#fefefe
| 80203 ||  || — || November 4, 1999 || Socorro || LINEAR || FLO || align=right | 1.6 km || 
|-id=204 bgcolor=#fefefe
| 80204 ||  || — || November 4, 1999 || Socorro || LINEAR || — || align=right | 1.5 km || 
|-id=205 bgcolor=#fefefe
| 80205 ||  || — || November 4, 1999 || Socorro || LINEAR || FLO || align=right | 1.2 km || 
|-id=206 bgcolor=#fefefe
| 80206 ||  || — || November 4, 1999 || Socorro || LINEAR || — || align=right | 1.8 km || 
|-id=207 bgcolor=#fefefe
| 80207 ||  || — || November 1, 1999 || Kitt Peak || Spacewatch || — || align=right | 2.2 km || 
|-id=208 bgcolor=#fefefe
| 80208 ||  || — || November 4, 1999 || Socorro || LINEAR || — || align=right | 1.9 km || 
|-id=209 bgcolor=#fefefe
| 80209 ||  || — || November 4, 1999 || Socorro || LINEAR || NYS || align=right data-sort-value="0.95" | 950 m || 
|-id=210 bgcolor=#fefefe
| 80210 ||  || — || November 5, 1999 || Socorro || LINEAR || — || align=right | 1.7 km || 
|-id=211 bgcolor=#fefefe
| 80211 ||  || — || November 9, 1999 || Socorro || LINEAR || — || align=right | 1.6 km || 
|-id=212 bgcolor=#fefefe
| 80212 ||  || — || November 9, 1999 || Socorro || LINEAR || — || align=right | 1.4 km || 
|-id=213 bgcolor=#fefefe
| 80213 ||  || — || November 9, 1999 || Socorro || LINEAR || — || align=right | 1.2 km || 
|-id=214 bgcolor=#fefefe
| 80214 ||  || — || November 9, 1999 || Socorro || LINEAR || FLO || align=right | 2.8 km || 
|-id=215 bgcolor=#fefefe
| 80215 ||  || — || November 9, 1999 || Socorro || LINEAR || — || align=right | 1.7 km || 
|-id=216 bgcolor=#fefefe
| 80216 ||  || — || November 9, 1999 || Socorro || LINEAR || — || align=right | 1.3 km || 
|-id=217 bgcolor=#fefefe
| 80217 ||  || — || November 9, 1999 || Catalina || CSS || — || align=right | 1.6 km || 
|-id=218 bgcolor=#fefefe
| 80218 ||  || — || November 5, 1999 || Kitt Peak || Spacewatch || moon || align=right | 1.4 km || 
|-id=219 bgcolor=#fefefe
| 80219 ||  || — || November 5, 1999 || Kitt Peak || Spacewatch || — || align=right | 1.6 km || 
|-id=220 bgcolor=#E9E9E9
| 80220 ||  || — || November 11, 1999 || Catalina || CSS || — || align=right | 4.2 km || 
|-id=221 bgcolor=#fefefe
| 80221 ||  || — || November 11, 1999 || Catalina || CSS || FLO || align=right | 1.6 km || 
|-id=222 bgcolor=#fefefe
| 80222 ||  || — || November 11, 1999 || Catalina || CSS || FLO || align=right | 1.1 km || 
|-id=223 bgcolor=#fefefe
| 80223 ||  || — || November 14, 1999 || Socorro || LINEAR || — || align=right | 1.7 km || 
|-id=224 bgcolor=#fefefe
| 80224 ||  || — || November 14, 1999 || Socorro || LINEAR || — || align=right | 1.3 km || 
|-id=225 bgcolor=#fefefe
| 80225 ||  || — || November 14, 1999 || Socorro || LINEAR || — || align=right | 1.5 km || 
|-id=226 bgcolor=#fefefe
| 80226 ||  || — || November 14, 1999 || Socorro || LINEAR || — || align=right | 1.5 km || 
|-id=227 bgcolor=#fefefe
| 80227 ||  || — || November 14, 1999 || Socorro || LINEAR || FLOfast? || align=right | 1.5 km || 
|-id=228 bgcolor=#fefefe
| 80228 ||  || — || November 14, 1999 || Socorro || LINEAR || — || align=right | 1.3 km || 
|-id=229 bgcolor=#fefefe
| 80229 ||  || — || November 14, 1999 || Socorro || LINEAR || — || align=right | 3.0 km || 
|-id=230 bgcolor=#fefefe
| 80230 ||  || — || November 14, 1999 || Socorro || LINEAR || V || align=right | 1.4 km || 
|-id=231 bgcolor=#fefefe
| 80231 ||  || — || November 15, 1999 || Socorro || LINEAR || — || align=right | 1.4 km || 
|-id=232 bgcolor=#fefefe
| 80232 ||  || — || November 15, 1999 || Socorro || LINEAR || NYS || align=right | 1.1 km || 
|-id=233 bgcolor=#fefefe
| 80233 ||  || — || November 15, 1999 || Socorro || LINEAR || FLO || align=right | 1.5 km || 
|-id=234 bgcolor=#fefefe
| 80234 ||  || — || November 3, 1999 || Catalina || CSS || V || align=right | 1.1 km || 
|-id=235 bgcolor=#fefefe
| 80235 ||  || — || November 3, 1999 || Socorro || LINEAR || — || align=right | 1.6 km || 
|-id=236 bgcolor=#fefefe
| 80236 ||  || — || November 3, 1999 || Socorro || LINEAR || — || align=right | 2.0 km || 
|-id=237 bgcolor=#fefefe
| 80237 ||  || — || November 10, 1999 || Kitt Peak || Spacewatch || — || align=right | 1.0 km || 
|-id=238 bgcolor=#fefefe
| 80238 ||  || — || November 5, 1999 || Socorro || LINEAR || PHO || align=right | 6.0 km || 
|-id=239 bgcolor=#fefefe
| 80239 ||  || — || November 3, 1999 || Socorro || LINEAR || — || align=right | 1.8 km || 
|-id=240 bgcolor=#fefefe
| 80240 ||  || — || November 5, 1999 || Socorro || LINEAR || FLO || align=right | 2.2 km || 
|-id=241 bgcolor=#fefefe
| 80241 ||  || — || November 5, 1999 || Socorro || LINEAR || FLO || align=right data-sort-value="0.90" | 900 m || 
|-id=242 bgcolor=#fefefe
| 80242 || 1999 WT || — || November 18, 1999 || Oohira || T. Urata || — || align=right | 1.5 km || 
|-id=243 bgcolor=#fefefe
| 80243 ||  || — || November 28, 1999 || Kleť || Kleť Obs. || — || align=right | 1.8 km || 
|-id=244 bgcolor=#fefefe
| 80244 ||  || — || November 25, 1999 || Višnjan Observatory || K. Korlević || FLO || align=right | 1.6 km || 
|-id=245 bgcolor=#fefefe
| 80245 ||  || — || November 28, 1999 || Oizumi || T. Kobayashi || — || align=right | 2.2 km || 
|-id=246 bgcolor=#fefefe
| 80246 ||  || — || November 28, 1999 || Višnjan Observatory || K. Korlević || — || align=right | 1.6 km || 
|-id=247 bgcolor=#fefefe
| 80247 ||  || — || November 28, 1999 || Višnjan Observatory || K. Korlević || — || align=right | 1.9 km || 
|-id=248 bgcolor=#fefefe
| 80248 ||  || — || November 28, 1999 || Višnjan Observatory || K. Korlević || — || align=right | 1.4 km || 
|-id=249 bgcolor=#fefefe
| 80249 ||  || — || November 30, 1999 || Zeno || T. Stafford || — || align=right | 1.8 km || 
|-id=250 bgcolor=#FA8072
| 80250 ||  || — || November 30, 1999 || Oizumi || T. Kobayashi || — || align=right | 2.1 km || 
|-id=251 bgcolor=#C2FFFF
| 80251 ||  || — || November 28, 1999 || Kitt Peak || Spacewatch || L4 || align=right | 13 km || 
|-id=252 bgcolor=#fefefe
| 80252 ||  || — || November 28, 1999 || Kitt Peak || Spacewatch || — || align=right | 1.3 km || 
|-id=253 bgcolor=#fefefe
| 80253 ||  || — || November 30, 1999 || Kitt Peak || Spacewatch || — || align=right | 2.8 km || 
|-id=254 bgcolor=#fefefe
| 80254 ||  || — || November 30, 1999 || Kitt Peak || Spacewatch || FLO || align=right data-sort-value="0.98" | 980 m || 
|-id=255 bgcolor=#fefefe
| 80255 ||  || — || November 16, 1999 || Catalina || CSS || — || align=right | 1.7 km || 
|-id=256 bgcolor=#fefefe
| 80256 ||  || — || December 2, 1999 || Oizumi || T. Kobayashi || — || align=right | 1.9 km || 
|-id=257 bgcolor=#fefefe
| 80257 ||  || — || December 4, 1999 || Catalina || CSS || — || align=right | 1.9 km || 
|-id=258 bgcolor=#fefefe
| 80258 ||  || — || December 4, 1999 || Catalina || CSS || — || align=right | 1.5 km || 
|-id=259 bgcolor=#fefefe
| 80259 ||  || — || December 4, 1999 || Catalina || CSS || — || align=right | 1.4 km || 
|-id=260 bgcolor=#fefefe
| 80260 ||  || — || December 4, 1999 || Catalina || CSS || FLO || align=right | 1.6 km || 
|-id=261 bgcolor=#fefefe
| 80261 ||  || — || December 4, 1999 || Kitt Peak || Spacewatch || — || align=right | 1.8 km || 
|-id=262 bgcolor=#fefefe
| 80262 ||  || — || December 5, 1999 || Socorro || LINEAR || — || align=right | 3.6 km || 
|-id=263 bgcolor=#fefefe
| 80263 ||  || — || December 5, 1999 || Višnjan Observatory || K. Korlević || V || align=right | 1.9 km || 
|-id=264 bgcolor=#fefefe
| 80264 ||  || — || December 5, 1999 || Višnjan Observatory || K. Korlević || — || align=right | 1.6 km || 
|-id=265 bgcolor=#fefefe
| 80265 ||  || — || December 5, 1999 || Socorro || LINEAR || — || align=right | 2.6 km || 
|-id=266 bgcolor=#fefefe
| 80266 ||  || — || December 5, 1999 || Socorro || LINEAR || — || align=right | 2.4 km || 
|-id=267 bgcolor=#fefefe
| 80267 ||  || — || December 6, 1999 || Socorro || LINEAR || — || align=right | 1.6 km || 
|-id=268 bgcolor=#fefefe
| 80268 ||  || — || December 6, 1999 || Socorro || LINEAR || — || align=right | 1.6 km || 
|-id=269 bgcolor=#fefefe
| 80269 ||  || — || December 6, 1999 || Socorro || LINEAR || — || align=right | 1.8 km || 
|-id=270 bgcolor=#fefefe
| 80270 ||  || — || December 6, 1999 || Socorro || LINEAR || V || align=right | 1.3 km || 
|-id=271 bgcolor=#fefefe
| 80271 ||  || — || December 6, 1999 || Socorro || LINEAR || V || align=right | 1.7 km || 
|-id=272 bgcolor=#fefefe
| 80272 ||  || — || December 6, 1999 || Socorro || LINEAR || FLO || align=right | 1.4 km || 
|-id=273 bgcolor=#fefefe
| 80273 ||  || — || December 6, 1999 || Socorro || LINEAR || V || align=right | 1.3 km || 
|-id=274 bgcolor=#fefefe
| 80274 ||  || — || December 6, 1999 || Socorro || LINEAR || — || align=right | 1.4 km || 
|-id=275 bgcolor=#fefefe
| 80275 ||  || — || December 6, 1999 || Socorro || LINEAR || NYS || align=right | 2.2 km || 
|-id=276 bgcolor=#E9E9E9
| 80276 ||  || — || December 6, 1999 || Socorro || LINEAR || — || align=right | 3.7 km || 
|-id=277 bgcolor=#E9E9E9
| 80277 ||  || — || December 6, 1999 || Socorro || LINEAR || — || align=right | 2.5 km || 
|-id=278 bgcolor=#fefefe
| 80278 ||  || — || December 6, 1999 || Socorro || LINEAR || — || align=right | 2.2 km || 
|-id=279 bgcolor=#fefefe
| 80279 ||  || — || December 6, 1999 || Socorro || LINEAR || — || align=right | 2.6 km || 
|-id=280 bgcolor=#fefefe
| 80280 ||  || — || December 6, 1999 || Socorro || LINEAR || NYS || align=right | 2.0 km || 
|-id=281 bgcolor=#fefefe
| 80281 ||  || — || December 6, 1999 || Socorro || LINEAR || V || align=right | 1.7 km || 
|-id=282 bgcolor=#fefefe
| 80282 ||  || — || December 7, 1999 || Socorro || LINEAR || — || align=right | 1.5 km || 
|-id=283 bgcolor=#fefefe
| 80283 ||  || — || December 6, 1999 || Oizumi || T. Kobayashi || FLO || align=right | 2.5 km || 
|-id=284 bgcolor=#fefefe
| 80284 ||  || — || December 6, 1999 || Socorro || LINEAR || FLO || align=right | 1.4 km || 
|-id=285 bgcolor=#fefefe
| 80285 ||  || — || December 7, 1999 || Socorro || LINEAR || NYS || align=right | 1.3 km || 
|-id=286 bgcolor=#fefefe
| 80286 ||  || — || December 7, 1999 || Socorro || LINEAR || — || align=right | 1.6 km || 
|-id=287 bgcolor=#fefefe
| 80287 ||  || — || December 7, 1999 || Socorro || LINEAR || — || align=right | 1.7 km || 
|-id=288 bgcolor=#fefefe
| 80288 ||  || — || December 7, 1999 || Socorro || LINEAR || V || align=right | 1.2 km || 
|-id=289 bgcolor=#fefefe
| 80289 ||  || — || December 7, 1999 || Socorro || LINEAR || — || align=right | 1.5 km || 
|-id=290 bgcolor=#fefefe
| 80290 ||  || — || December 7, 1999 || Socorro || LINEAR || — || align=right | 1.4 km || 
|-id=291 bgcolor=#fefefe
| 80291 ||  || — || December 7, 1999 || Socorro || LINEAR || — || align=right | 1.3 km || 
|-id=292 bgcolor=#fefefe
| 80292 ||  || — || December 7, 1999 || Socorro || LINEAR || — || align=right | 1.4 km || 
|-id=293 bgcolor=#fefefe
| 80293 ||  || — || December 7, 1999 || Socorro || LINEAR || — || align=right | 1.8 km || 
|-id=294 bgcolor=#fefefe
| 80294 ||  || — || December 7, 1999 || Socorro || LINEAR || — || align=right | 1.5 km || 
|-id=295 bgcolor=#fefefe
| 80295 ||  || — || December 7, 1999 || Socorro || LINEAR || FLO || align=right | 1.7 km || 
|-id=296 bgcolor=#fefefe
| 80296 ||  || — || December 7, 1999 || Socorro || LINEAR || — || align=right | 1.1 km || 
|-id=297 bgcolor=#fefefe
| 80297 ||  || — || December 7, 1999 || Socorro || LINEAR || NYS || align=right | 1.1 km || 
|-id=298 bgcolor=#fefefe
| 80298 ||  || — || December 7, 1999 || Socorro || LINEAR || — || align=right | 1.7 km || 
|-id=299 bgcolor=#fefefe
| 80299 ||  || — || December 7, 1999 || Socorro || LINEAR || — || align=right | 2.1 km || 
|-id=300 bgcolor=#fefefe
| 80300 ||  || — || December 7, 1999 || Socorro || LINEAR || FLO || align=right | 1.0 km || 
|}

80301–80400 

|-bgcolor=#fefefe
| 80301 ||  || — || December 7, 1999 || Socorro || LINEAR || — || align=right | 1.9 km || 
|-id=302 bgcolor=#C2FFFF
| 80302 ||  || — || December 7, 1999 || Socorro || LINEAR || L4 || align=right | 20 km || 
|-id=303 bgcolor=#fefefe
| 80303 ||  || — || December 7, 1999 || Socorro || LINEAR || — || align=right | 1.4 km || 
|-id=304 bgcolor=#fefefe
| 80304 ||  || — || December 7, 1999 || Socorro || LINEAR || V || align=right | 1.5 km || 
|-id=305 bgcolor=#fefefe
| 80305 ||  || — || December 7, 1999 || Socorro || LINEAR || NYS || align=right | 1.5 km || 
|-id=306 bgcolor=#fefefe
| 80306 ||  || — || December 7, 1999 || Socorro || LINEAR || FLO || align=right | 1.0 km || 
|-id=307 bgcolor=#fefefe
| 80307 ||  || — || December 7, 1999 || Socorro || LINEAR || EUT || align=right | 1.8 km || 
|-id=308 bgcolor=#fefefe
| 80308 ||  || — || December 7, 1999 || Socorro || LINEAR || NYS || align=right | 1.3 km || 
|-id=309 bgcolor=#fefefe
| 80309 ||  || — || December 7, 1999 || Socorro || LINEAR || MAS || align=right | 1.6 km || 
|-id=310 bgcolor=#fefefe
| 80310 ||  || — || December 7, 1999 || Socorro || LINEAR || — || align=right | 1.8 km || 
|-id=311 bgcolor=#fefefe
| 80311 ||  || — || December 7, 1999 || Socorro || LINEAR || — || align=right | 1.9 km || 
|-id=312 bgcolor=#fefefe
| 80312 ||  || — || December 7, 1999 || Socorro || LINEAR || FLO || align=right | 2.2 km || 
|-id=313 bgcolor=#fefefe
| 80313 ||  || — || December 7, 1999 || Socorro || LINEAR || NYS || align=right | 1.6 km || 
|-id=314 bgcolor=#fefefe
| 80314 ||  || — || December 7, 1999 || Socorro || LINEAR || MAS || align=right | 1.2 km || 
|-id=315 bgcolor=#fefefe
| 80315 ||  || — || December 7, 1999 || Socorro || LINEAR || — || align=right | 1.5 km || 
|-id=316 bgcolor=#fefefe
| 80316 ||  || — || December 7, 1999 || Socorro || LINEAR || — || align=right | 1.3 km || 
|-id=317 bgcolor=#fefefe
| 80317 ||  || — || December 7, 1999 || Socorro || LINEAR || — || align=right | 1.7 km || 
|-id=318 bgcolor=#fefefe
| 80318 ||  || — || December 7, 1999 || Socorro || LINEAR || — || align=right | 1.6 km || 
|-id=319 bgcolor=#fefefe
| 80319 ||  || — || December 7, 1999 || Socorro || LINEAR || FLO || align=right | 1.3 km || 
|-id=320 bgcolor=#fefefe
| 80320 ||  || — || December 7, 1999 || Socorro || LINEAR || — || align=right | 2.8 km || 
|-id=321 bgcolor=#fefefe
| 80321 ||  || — || December 7, 1999 || Socorro || LINEAR || FLO || align=right | 1.8 km || 
|-id=322 bgcolor=#fefefe
| 80322 ||  || — || December 7, 1999 || Socorro || LINEAR || NYS || align=right | 3.2 km || 
|-id=323 bgcolor=#fefefe
| 80323 ||  || — || December 7, 1999 || Socorro || LINEAR || — || align=right | 1.5 km || 
|-id=324 bgcolor=#fefefe
| 80324 ||  || — || December 7, 1999 || Socorro || LINEAR || — || align=right | 2.2 km || 
|-id=325 bgcolor=#fefefe
| 80325 ||  || — || December 7, 1999 || Socorro || LINEAR || — || align=right | 1.8 km || 
|-id=326 bgcolor=#fefefe
| 80326 ||  || — || December 7, 1999 || Socorro || LINEAR || — || align=right | 2.4 km || 
|-id=327 bgcolor=#fefefe
| 80327 ||  || — || December 7, 1999 || Socorro || LINEAR || FLO || align=right | 1.3 km || 
|-id=328 bgcolor=#fefefe
| 80328 ||  || — || December 7, 1999 || Socorro || LINEAR || V || align=right | 1.7 km || 
|-id=329 bgcolor=#fefefe
| 80329 ||  || — || December 7, 1999 || Socorro || LINEAR || — || align=right | 2.2 km || 
|-id=330 bgcolor=#fefefe
| 80330 ||  || — || December 7, 1999 || Socorro || LINEAR || FLO || align=right | 1.6 km || 
|-id=331 bgcolor=#fefefe
| 80331 ||  || — || December 7, 1999 || Socorro || LINEAR || — || align=right | 1.7 km || 
|-id=332 bgcolor=#fefefe
| 80332 ||  || — || December 7, 1999 || Socorro || LINEAR || — || align=right | 2.3 km || 
|-id=333 bgcolor=#fefefe
| 80333 ||  || — || December 7, 1999 || Socorro || LINEAR || — || align=right | 2.3 km || 
|-id=334 bgcolor=#fefefe
| 80334 ||  || — || December 7, 1999 || Socorro || LINEAR || FLO || align=right | 3.1 km || 
|-id=335 bgcolor=#fefefe
| 80335 ||  || — || December 7, 1999 || Oizumi || T. Kobayashi || — || align=right | 1.8 km || 
|-id=336 bgcolor=#fefefe
| 80336 ||  || — || December 7, 1999 || Socorro || LINEAR || NYS || align=right | 1.6 km || 
|-id=337 bgcolor=#fefefe
| 80337 ||  || — || December 7, 1999 || Socorro || LINEAR || FLO || align=right | 3.4 km || 
|-id=338 bgcolor=#fefefe
| 80338 ||  || — || December 7, 1999 || Socorro || LINEAR || V || align=right | 1.3 km || 
|-id=339 bgcolor=#fefefe
| 80339 ||  || — || December 7, 1999 || Nachi-Katsuura || Y. Shimizu, T. Urata || — || align=right | 2.2 km || 
|-id=340 bgcolor=#fefefe
| 80340 ||  || — || December 4, 1999 || Catalina || CSS || — || align=right | 1.4 km || 
|-id=341 bgcolor=#fefefe
| 80341 ||  || — || December 4, 1999 || Catalina || CSS || NYS || align=right | 1.3 km || 
|-id=342 bgcolor=#fefefe
| 80342 ||  || — || December 4, 1999 || Catalina || CSS || NYS || align=right | 1.3 km || 
|-id=343 bgcolor=#fefefe
| 80343 ||  || — || December 7, 1999 || Catalina || CSS || PHO || align=right | 2.8 km || 
|-id=344 bgcolor=#fefefe
| 80344 ||  || — || December 10, 1999 || Socorro || LINEAR || V || align=right | 1.5 km || 
|-id=345 bgcolor=#fefefe
| 80345 ||  || — || December 11, 1999 || Socorro || LINEAR || — || align=right | 1.8 km || 
|-id=346 bgcolor=#fefefe
| 80346 ||  || — || December 11, 1999 || Socorro || LINEAR || — || align=right | 2.1 km || 
|-id=347 bgcolor=#fefefe
| 80347 ||  || — || December 4, 1999 || Catalina || CSS || FLO || align=right | 2.2 km || 
|-id=348 bgcolor=#fefefe
| 80348 ||  || — || December 4, 1999 || Catalina || CSS || — || align=right | 1.5 km || 
|-id=349 bgcolor=#fefefe
| 80349 ||  || — || December 5, 1999 || Catalina || CSS || — || align=right | 1.7 km || 
|-id=350 bgcolor=#fefefe
| 80350 ||  || — || December 5, 1999 || Catalina || CSS || FLO || align=right | 1.8 km || 
|-id=351 bgcolor=#fefefe
| 80351 ||  || — || December 5, 1999 || Catalina || CSS || — || align=right | 1.9 km || 
|-id=352 bgcolor=#fefefe
| 80352 ||  || — || December 5, 1999 || Catalina || CSS || — || align=right | 1.8 km || 
|-id=353 bgcolor=#fefefe
| 80353 ||  || — || December 5, 1999 || Catalina || CSS || — || align=right | 2.9 km || 
|-id=354 bgcolor=#fefefe
| 80354 ||  || — || December 5, 1999 || Catalina || CSS || NYS || align=right | 1.3 km || 
|-id=355 bgcolor=#fefefe
| 80355 ||  || — || December 7, 1999 || Catalina || CSS || — || align=right | 1.7 km || 
|-id=356 bgcolor=#FA8072
| 80356 ||  || — || December 7, 1999 || Catalina || CSS || — || align=right | 1.9 km || 
|-id=357 bgcolor=#fefefe
| 80357 ||  || — || December 7, 1999 || Catalina || CSS || — || align=right | 2.8 km || 
|-id=358 bgcolor=#fefefe
| 80358 ||  || — || December 7, 1999 || Catalina || CSS || FLO || align=right | 1.1 km || 
|-id=359 bgcolor=#fefefe
| 80359 ||  || — || December 7, 1999 || Catalina || CSS || — || align=right | 1.6 km || 
|-id=360 bgcolor=#fefefe
| 80360 ||  || — || December 12, 1999 || Socorro || LINEAR || FLO || align=right | 4.0 km || 
|-id=361 bgcolor=#fefefe
| 80361 ||  || — || December 12, 1999 || Socorro || LINEAR || FLO || align=right | 1.2 km || 
|-id=362 bgcolor=#fefefe
| 80362 ||  || — || December 12, 1999 || Socorro || LINEAR || — || align=right | 2.4 km || 
|-id=363 bgcolor=#fefefe
| 80363 ||  || — || December 12, 1999 || Socorro || LINEAR || — || align=right | 1.8 km || 
|-id=364 bgcolor=#fefefe
| 80364 ||  || — || December 8, 1999 || Socorro || LINEAR || FLO || align=right | 2.3 km || 
|-id=365 bgcolor=#fefefe
| 80365 ||  || — || December 6, 1999 || Kitt Peak || Spacewatch || FLO || align=right | 1.9 km || 
|-id=366 bgcolor=#FA8072
| 80366 ||  || — || December 12, 1999 || Socorro || LINEAR || PHO || align=right | 2.9 km || 
|-id=367 bgcolor=#fefefe
| 80367 ||  || — || December 7, 1999 || Kitt Peak || Spacewatch || — || align=right | 1.1 km || 
|-id=368 bgcolor=#fefefe
| 80368 ||  || — || December 7, 1999 || Kitt Peak || Spacewatch || V || align=right | 1.5 km || 
|-id=369 bgcolor=#fefefe
| 80369 ||  || — || December 7, 1999 || Kitt Peak || Spacewatch || — || align=right | 1.9 km || 
|-id=370 bgcolor=#fefefe
| 80370 ||  || — || December 8, 1999 || Socorro || LINEAR || V || align=right | 1.5 km || 
|-id=371 bgcolor=#fefefe
| 80371 ||  || — || December 8, 1999 || Socorro || LINEAR || V || align=right | 1.7 km || 
|-id=372 bgcolor=#fefefe
| 80372 ||  || — || December 8, 1999 || Socorro || LINEAR || V || align=right | 1.3 km || 
|-id=373 bgcolor=#fefefe
| 80373 ||  || — || December 8, 1999 || Socorro || LINEAR || NYS || align=right | 1.3 km || 
|-id=374 bgcolor=#fefefe
| 80374 ||  || — || December 8, 1999 || Socorro || LINEAR || FLO || align=right | 1.5 km || 
|-id=375 bgcolor=#fefefe
| 80375 ||  || — || December 8, 1999 || Socorro || LINEAR || — || align=right | 2.7 km || 
|-id=376 bgcolor=#fefefe
| 80376 ||  || — || December 8, 1999 || Socorro || LINEAR || V || align=right | 1.2 km || 
|-id=377 bgcolor=#fefefe
| 80377 ||  || — || December 8, 1999 || Socorro || LINEAR || — || align=right | 2.1 km || 
|-id=378 bgcolor=#fefefe
| 80378 ||  || — || December 8, 1999 || Socorro || LINEAR || NYS || align=right | 1.2 km || 
|-id=379 bgcolor=#E9E9E9
| 80379 ||  || — || December 8, 1999 || Socorro || LINEAR || — || align=right | 3.9 km || 
|-id=380 bgcolor=#fefefe
| 80380 ||  || — || December 8, 1999 || Socorro || LINEAR || — || align=right | 2.0 km || 
|-id=381 bgcolor=#fefefe
| 80381 ||  || — || December 8, 1999 || Socorro || LINEAR || — || align=right | 1.8 km || 
|-id=382 bgcolor=#fefefe
| 80382 ||  || — || December 8, 1999 || Socorro || LINEAR || FLO || align=right | 1.6 km || 
|-id=383 bgcolor=#E9E9E9
| 80383 ||  || — || December 8, 1999 || Socorro || LINEAR || — || align=right | 2.1 km || 
|-id=384 bgcolor=#fefefe
| 80384 ||  || — || December 8, 1999 || Kitt Peak || Spacewatch || NYS || align=right | 1.2 km || 
|-id=385 bgcolor=#fefefe
| 80385 ||  || — || December 8, 1999 || Socorro || LINEAR || — || align=right | 1.5 km || 
|-id=386 bgcolor=#fefefe
| 80386 ||  || — || December 8, 1999 || Socorro || LINEAR || — || align=right | 2.4 km || 
|-id=387 bgcolor=#fefefe
| 80387 ||  || — || December 10, 1999 || Socorro || LINEAR || NYS || align=right | 1.7 km || 
|-id=388 bgcolor=#fefefe
| 80388 ||  || — || December 10, 1999 || Socorro || LINEAR || — || align=right | 2.4 km || 
|-id=389 bgcolor=#fefefe
| 80389 ||  || — || December 10, 1999 || Socorro || LINEAR || — || align=right | 2.0 km || 
|-id=390 bgcolor=#fefefe
| 80390 ||  || — || December 10, 1999 || Socorro || LINEAR || NYS || align=right | 1.6 km || 
|-id=391 bgcolor=#fefefe
| 80391 ||  || — || December 10, 1999 || Socorro || LINEAR || NYS || align=right | 1.5 km || 
|-id=392 bgcolor=#fefefe
| 80392 ||  || — || December 10, 1999 || Socorro || LINEAR || — || align=right | 1.7 km || 
|-id=393 bgcolor=#fefefe
| 80393 ||  || — || December 10, 1999 || Socorro || LINEAR || — || align=right | 2.8 km || 
|-id=394 bgcolor=#fefefe
| 80394 ||  || — || December 10, 1999 || Socorro || LINEAR || — || align=right | 2.0 km || 
|-id=395 bgcolor=#fefefe
| 80395 ||  || — || December 10, 1999 || Socorro || LINEAR || FLO || align=right | 2.9 km || 
|-id=396 bgcolor=#fefefe
| 80396 ||  || — || December 10, 1999 || Socorro || LINEAR || FLO || align=right | 1.6 km || 
|-id=397 bgcolor=#fefefe
| 80397 ||  || — || December 10, 1999 || Socorro || LINEAR || FLO || align=right | 1.9 km || 
|-id=398 bgcolor=#E9E9E9
| 80398 ||  || — || December 10, 1999 || Socorro || LINEAR || — || align=right | 2.8 km || 
|-id=399 bgcolor=#fefefe
| 80399 ||  || — || December 10, 1999 || Socorro || LINEAR || — || align=right | 2.0 km || 
|-id=400 bgcolor=#fefefe
| 80400 ||  || — || December 10, 1999 || Socorro || LINEAR || — || align=right | 2.3 km || 
|}

80401–80500 

|-bgcolor=#fefefe
| 80401 ||  || — || December 10, 1999 || Socorro || LINEAR || V || align=right | 2.1 km || 
|-id=402 bgcolor=#fefefe
| 80402 ||  || — || December 10, 1999 || Socorro || LINEAR || NYS || align=right | 1.5 km || 
|-id=403 bgcolor=#fefefe
| 80403 ||  || — || December 12, 1999 || Socorro || LINEAR || — || align=right | 2.2 km || 
|-id=404 bgcolor=#fefefe
| 80404 ||  || — || December 12, 1999 || Socorro || LINEAR || — || align=right | 4.0 km || 
|-id=405 bgcolor=#fefefe
| 80405 ||  || — || December 12, 1999 || Socorro || LINEAR || FLO || align=right | 2.3 km || 
|-id=406 bgcolor=#fefefe
| 80406 ||  || — || December 12, 1999 || Socorro || LINEAR || V || align=right | 1.5 km || 
|-id=407 bgcolor=#fefefe
| 80407 ||  || — || December 12, 1999 || Socorro || LINEAR || — || align=right | 2.0 km || 
|-id=408 bgcolor=#fefefe
| 80408 ||  || — || December 12, 1999 || Socorro || LINEAR || — || align=right | 2.1 km || 
|-id=409 bgcolor=#fefefe
| 80409 ||  || — || December 12, 1999 || Socorro || LINEAR || V || align=right | 1.3 km || 
|-id=410 bgcolor=#fefefe
| 80410 ||  || — || December 12, 1999 || Socorro || LINEAR || FLO || align=right | 1.5 km || 
|-id=411 bgcolor=#fefefe
| 80411 ||  || — || December 12, 1999 || Socorro || LINEAR || — || align=right | 1.6 km || 
|-id=412 bgcolor=#fefefe
| 80412 ||  || — || December 12, 1999 || Socorro || LINEAR || ERI || align=right | 2.7 km || 
|-id=413 bgcolor=#fefefe
| 80413 ||  || — || December 12, 1999 || Socorro || LINEAR || FLO || align=right | 1.8 km || 
|-id=414 bgcolor=#fefefe
| 80414 ||  || — || December 12, 1999 || Socorro || LINEAR || — || align=right | 2.4 km || 
|-id=415 bgcolor=#fefefe
| 80415 ||  || — || December 12, 1999 || Socorro || LINEAR || — || align=right | 1.9 km || 
|-id=416 bgcolor=#fefefe
| 80416 ||  || — || December 12, 1999 || Socorro || LINEAR || V || align=right | 1.4 km || 
|-id=417 bgcolor=#fefefe
| 80417 ||  || — || December 12, 1999 || Socorro || LINEAR || V || align=right | 1.9 km || 
|-id=418 bgcolor=#fefefe
| 80418 ||  || — || December 12, 1999 || Socorro || LINEAR || — || align=right | 2.6 km || 
|-id=419 bgcolor=#fefefe
| 80419 ||  || — || December 12, 1999 || Socorro || LINEAR || V || align=right | 1.5 km || 
|-id=420 bgcolor=#fefefe
| 80420 ||  || — || December 13, 1999 || Socorro || LINEAR || — || align=right | 2.1 km || 
|-id=421 bgcolor=#fefefe
| 80421 ||  || — || December 14, 1999 || Socorro || LINEAR || — || align=right | 1.7 km || 
|-id=422 bgcolor=#E9E9E9
| 80422 ||  || — || December 14, 1999 || Socorro || LINEAR || — || align=right | 1.8 km || 
|-id=423 bgcolor=#fefefe
| 80423 ||  || — || December 14, 1999 || Socorro || LINEAR || FLO || align=right | 2.8 km || 
|-id=424 bgcolor=#fefefe
| 80424 ||  || — || December 13, 1999 || Kitt Peak || Spacewatch || — || align=right | 1.5 km || 
|-id=425 bgcolor=#fefefe
| 80425 ||  || — || December 15, 1999 || Kitt Peak || Spacewatch || — || align=right | 1.8 km || 
|-id=426 bgcolor=#fefefe
| 80426 ||  || — || December 15, 1999 || Socorro || LINEAR || — || align=right | 2.3 km || 
|-id=427 bgcolor=#fefefe
| 80427 ||  || — || December 15, 1999 || Socorro || LINEAR || — || align=right | 2.4 km || 
|-id=428 bgcolor=#fefefe
| 80428 ||  || — || December 13, 1999 || Kitt Peak || Spacewatch || — || align=right | 2.2 km || 
|-id=429 bgcolor=#fefefe
| 80429 ||  || — || December 13, 1999 || Kitt Peak || Spacewatch || — || align=right | 2.4 km || 
|-id=430 bgcolor=#fefefe
| 80430 ||  || — || December 15, 1999 || Kitt Peak || Spacewatch || MAS || align=right | 1.0 km || 
|-id=431 bgcolor=#fefefe
| 80431 ||  || — || December 15, 1999 || Kitt Peak || Spacewatch || NYS || align=right | 1.3 km || 
|-id=432 bgcolor=#fefefe
| 80432 ||  || — || December 7, 1999 || Catalina || CSS || — || align=right | 2.0 km || 
|-id=433 bgcolor=#fefefe
| 80433 ||  || — || December 4, 1999 || Anderson Mesa || LONEOS || — || align=right | 2.4 km || 
|-id=434 bgcolor=#fefefe
| 80434 ||  || — || December 3, 1999 || Anderson Mesa || LONEOS || — || align=right | 1.5 km || 
|-id=435 bgcolor=#fefefe
| 80435 ||  || — || December 4, 1999 || Catalina || CSS || — || align=right | 2.4 km || 
|-id=436 bgcolor=#fefefe
| 80436 ||  || — || December 5, 1999 || Socorro || LINEAR || V || align=right | 1.2 km || 
|-id=437 bgcolor=#fefefe
| 80437 ||  || — || December 6, 1999 || Socorro || LINEAR || FLO || align=right | 1.0 km || 
|-id=438 bgcolor=#fefefe
| 80438 ||  || — || December 6, 1999 || Socorro || LINEAR || V || align=right | 1.4 km || 
|-id=439 bgcolor=#fefefe
| 80439 ||  || — || December 8, 1999 || Socorro || LINEAR || — || align=right | 1.4 km || 
|-id=440 bgcolor=#fefefe
| 80440 ||  || — || December 12, 1999 || Socorro || LINEAR || — || align=right | 1.9 km || 
|-id=441 bgcolor=#E9E9E9
| 80441 ||  || — || December 18, 1999 || Socorro || LINEAR || — || align=right | 2.5 km || 
|-id=442 bgcolor=#fefefe
| 80442 ||  || — || December 28, 1999 || Olathe || Olathe || FLO || align=right | 1.4 km || 
|-id=443 bgcolor=#fefefe
| 80443 ||  || — || December 27, 1999 || Kitt Peak || Spacewatch || — || align=right | 2.1 km || 
|-id=444 bgcolor=#fefefe
| 80444 ||  || — || December 31, 1999 || Višnjan Observatory || K. Korlević || — || align=right | 2.8 km || 
|-id=445 bgcolor=#fefefe
| 80445 ||  || — || December 27, 1999 || Kitt Peak || Spacewatch || NYS || align=right | 1.3 km || 
|-id=446 bgcolor=#fefefe
| 80446 ||  || — || December 31, 1999 || Višnjan Observatory || K. Korlević || — || align=right | 2.0 km || 
|-id=447 bgcolor=#fefefe
| 80447 ||  || — || December 31, 1999 || Prescott || P. G. Comba || NYS || align=right | 1.4 km || 
|-id=448 bgcolor=#fefefe
| 80448 ||  || — || December 31, 1999 || Kitt Peak || Spacewatch || — || align=right | 4.1 km || 
|-id=449 bgcolor=#fefefe
| 80449 ||  || — || December 31, 1999 || Kitt Peak || Spacewatch || NYS || align=right | 1.5 km || 
|-id=450 bgcolor=#fefefe
| 80450 ||  || — || December 30, 1999 || Socorro || LINEAR || — || align=right | 5.1 km || 
|-id=451 bgcolor=#fefefe
| 80451 Alwoods || 2000 AA ||  || January 1, 2000 || Oaxaca || J. M. Roe || FLO || align=right | 1.5 km || 
|-id=452 bgcolor=#fefefe
| 80452 || 2000 AK || — || January 2, 2000 || Fountain Hills || C. W. Juels || — || align=right | 2.6 km || 
|-id=453 bgcolor=#fefefe
| 80453 ||  || — || January 3, 2000 || Oizumi || T. Kobayashi || — || align=right | 2.6 km || 
|-id=454 bgcolor=#fefefe
| 80454 ||  || — || January 3, 2000 || Socorro || LINEAR || — || align=right | 1.6 km || 
|-id=455 bgcolor=#fefefe
| 80455 ||  || — || January 3, 2000 || Socorro || LINEAR || — || align=right | 2.7 km || 
|-id=456 bgcolor=#fefefe
| 80456 ||  || — || January 2, 2000 || Socorro || LINEAR || — || align=right | 2.7 km || 
|-id=457 bgcolor=#fefefe
| 80457 ||  || — || January 2, 2000 || Socorro || LINEAR || ERI || align=right | 4.1 km || 
|-id=458 bgcolor=#fefefe
| 80458 ||  || — || January 2, 2000 || Socorro || LINEAR || — || align=right | 2.5 km || 
|-id=459 bgcolor=#fefefe
| 80459 ||  || — || January 3, 2000 || Socorro || LINEAR || V || align=right | 1.6 km || 
|-id=460 bgcolor=#fefefe
| 80460 ||  || — || January 3, 2000 || Socorro || LINEAR || NYS || align=right | 1.3 km || 
|-id=461 bgcolor=#fefefe
| 80461 ||  || — || January 3, 2000 || Socorro || LINEAR || FLO || align=right | 1.8 km || 
|-id=462 bgcolor=#fefefe
| 80462 ||  || — || January 3, 2000 || Socorro || LINEAR || — || align=right | 1.9 km || 
|-id=463 bgcolor=#fefefe
| 80463 ||  || — || January 3, 2000 || Socorro || LINEAR || — || align=right | 2.0 km || 
|-id=464 bgcolor=#fefefe
| 80464 ||  || — || January 3, 2000 || Socorro || LINEAR || — || align=right | 2.0 km || 
|-id=465 bgcolor=#fefefe
| 80465 ||  || — || January 3, 2000 || Socorro || LINEAR || FLO || align=right | 1.6 km || 
|-id=466 bgcolor=#fefefe
| 80466 ||  || — || January 3, 2000 || Socorro || LINEAR || NYS || align=right | 2.8 km || 
|-id=467 bgcolor=#fefefe
| 80467 ||  || — || January 3, 2000 || Socorro || LINEAR || NYS || align=right | 1.3 km || 
|-id=468 bgcolor=#fefefe
| 80468 ||  || — || January 3, 2000 || Socorro || LINEAR || — || align=right | 1.6 km || 
|-id=469 bgcolor=#fefefe
| 80469 ||  || — || January 3, 2000 || Socorro || LINEAR || — || align=right | 2.1 km || 
|-id=470 bgcolor=#fefefe
| 80470 ||  || — || January 3, 2000 || Socorro || LINEAR || NYS || align=right | 1.3 km || 
|-id=471 bgcolor=#fefefe
| 80471 ||  || — || January 3, 2000 || Socorro || LINEAR || ERI || align=right | 4.3 km || 
|-id=472 bgcolor=#fefefe
| 80472 ||  || — || January 3, 2000 || Socorro || LINEAR || FLO || align=right | 1.6 km || 
|-id=473 bgcolor=#fefefe
| 80473 ||  || — || January 3, 2000 || Socorro || LINEAR || V || align=right | 1.8 km || 
|-id=474 bgcolor=#fefefe
| 80474 ||  || — || January 3, 2000 || Socorro || LINEAR || V || align=right | 1.8 km || 
|-id=475 bgcolor=#fefefe
| 80475 ||  || — || January 3, 2000 || Socorro || LINEAR || FLO || align=right | 1.5 km || 
|-id=476 bgcolor=#fefefe
| 80476 ||  || — || January 3, 2000 || Socorro || LINEAR || V || align=right | 1.2 km || 
|-id=477 bgcolor=#E9E9E9
| 80477 ||  || — || January 3, 2000 || Socorro || LINEAR || — || align=right | 2.0 km || 
|-id=478 bgcolor=#fefefe
| 80478 ||  || — || January 3, 2000 || Socorro || LINEAR || NYS || align=right | 1.6 km || 
|-id=479 bgcolor=#fefefe
| 80479 ||  || — || January 3, 2000 || Socorro || LINEAR || FLO || align=right | 2.4 km || 
|-id=480 bgcolor=#fefefe
| 80480 ||  || — || January 3, 2000 || Socorro || LINEAR || FLO || align=right | 1.4 km || 
|-id=481 bgcolor=#fefefe
| 80481 ||  || — || January 3, 2000 || Socorro || LINEAR || — || align=right | 2.2 km || 
|-id=482 bgcolor=#fefefe
| 80482 ||  || — || January 3, 2000 || Socorro || LINEAR || NYS || align=right | 1.7 km || 
|-id=483 bgcolor=#fefefe
| 80483 ||  || — || January 3, 2000 || Socorro || LINEAR || V || align=right | 2.2 km || 
|-id=484 bgcolor=#fefefe
| 80484 ||  || — || January 3, 2000 || Socorro || LINEAR || — || align=right | 2.1 km || 
|-id=485 bgcolor=#fefefe
| 80485 ||  || — || January 3, 2000 || Socorro || LINEAR || — || align=right | 1.9 km || 
|-id=486 bgcolor=#E9E9E9
| 80486 ||  || — || January 3, 2000 || Socorro || LINEAR || MIS || align=right | 4.1 km || 
|-id=487 bgcolor=#fefefe
| 80487 ||  || — || January 3, 2000 || Socorro || LINEAR || FLO || align=right | 1.7 km || 
|-id=488 bgcolor=#fefefe
| 80488 ||  || — || January 3, 2000 || Socorro || LINEAR || — || align=right | 2.4 km || 
|-id=489 bgcolor=#fefefe
| 80489 ||  || — || January 5, 2000 || Kitt Peak || Spacewatch || — || align=right | 1.7 km || 
|-id=490 bgcolor=#fefefe
| 80490 ||  || — || January 5, 2000 || Kitt Peak || Spacewatch || — || align=right | 1.9 km || 
|-id=491 bgcolor=#fefefe
| 80491 ||  || — || January 3, 2000 || Socorro || LINEAR || FLO || align=right | 2.0 km || 
|-id=492 bgcolor=#fefefe
| 80492 ||  || — || January 4, 2000 || Socorro || LINEAR || NYS || align=right | 1.4 km || 
|-id=493 bgcolor=#fefefe
| 80493 ||  || — || January 4, 2000 || Socorro || LINEAR || NYS || align=right | 1.5 km || 
|-id=494 bgcolor=#fefefe
| 80494 ||  || — || January 4, 2000 || Socorro || LINEAR || V || align=right | 1.7 km || 
|-id=495 bgcolor=#fefefe
| 80495 ||  || — || January 3, 2000 || Socorro || LINEAR || — || align=right | 1.3 km || 
|-id=496 bgcolor=#fefefe
| 80496 ||  || — || January 5, 2000 || Socorro || LINEAR || — || align=right | 2.3 km || 
|-id=497 bgcolor=#E9E9E9
| 80497 ||  || — || January 5, 2000 || Socorro || LINEAR || BRU || align=right | 6.4 km || 
|-id=498 bgcolor=#fefefe
| 80498 ||  || — || January 5, 2000 || Višnjan Observatory || K. Korlević || FLO || align=right | 2.2 km || 
|-id=499 bgcolor=#E9E9E9
| 80499 ||  || — || January 5, 2000 || Fountain Hills || C. W. Juels || — || align=right | 2.9 km || 
|-id=500 bgcolor=#fefefe
| 80500 ||  || — || January 4, 2000 || Socorro || LINEAR || — || align=right | 3.0 km || 
|}

80501–80600 

|-bgcolor=#fefefe
| 80501 ||  || — || January 4, 2000 || Socorro || LINEAR || — || align=right | 3.6 km || 
|-id=502 bgcolor=#fefefe
| 80502 ||  || — || January 4, 2000 || Socorro || LINEAR || — || align=right | 2.3 km || 
|-id=503 bgcolor=#fefefe
| 80503 ||  || — || January 4, 2000 || Socorro || LINEAR || — || align=right | 3.0 km || 
|-id=504 bgcolor=#fefefe
| 80504 ||  || — || January 4, 2000 || Socorro || LINEAR || MAS || align=right | 1.4 km || 
|-id=505 bgcolor=#fefefe
| 80505 ||  || — || January 4, 2000 || Socorro || LINEAR || FLO || align=right | 2.3 km || 
|-id=506 bgcolor=#fefefe
| 80506 ||  || — || January 4, 2000 || Socorro || LINEAR || — || align=right | 2.1 km || 
|-id=507 bgcolor=#fefefe
| 80507 ||  || — || January 4, 2000 || Socorro || LINEAR || — || align=right | 1.8 km || 
|-id=508 bgcolor=#fefefe
| 80508 ||  || — || January 4, 2000 || Socorro || LINEAR || NYS || align=right | 1.9 km || 
|-id=509 bgcolor=#fefefe
| 80509 ||  || — || January 4, 2000 || Socorro || LINEAR || — || align=right | 2.3 km || 
|-id=510 bgcolor=#fefefe
| 80510 ||  || — || January 4, 2000 || Socorro || LINEAR || — || align=right | 1.6 km || 
|-id=511 bgcolor=#fefefe
| 80511 ||  || — || January 4, 2000 || Socorro || LINEAR || — || align=right | 1.2 km || 
|-id=512 bgcolor=#fefefe
| 80512 ||  || — || January 4, 2000 || Socorro || LINEAR || — || align=right | 3.4 km || 
|-id=513 bgcolor=#fefefe
| 80513 ||  || — || January 4, 2000 || Socorro || LINEAR || V || align=right | 2.1 km || 
|-id=514 bgcolor=#fefefe
| 80514 ||  || — || January 4, 2000 || Socorro || LINEAR || NYS || align=right | 4.2 km || 
|-id=515 bgcolor=#fefefe
| 80515 ||  || — || January 4, 2000 || Socorro || LINEAR || — || align=right | 1.8 km || 
|-id=516 bgcolor=#fefefe
| 80516 ||  || — || January 4, 2000 || Socorro || LINEAR || — || align=right | 3.2 km || 
|-id=517 bgcolor=#fefefe
| 80517 ||  || — || January 4, 2000 || Socorro || LINEAR || — || align=right | 4.6 km || 
|-id=518 bgcolor=#fefefe
| 80518 ||  || — || January 4, 2000 || Socorro || LINEAR || — || align=right | 2.6 km || 
|-id=519 bgcolor=#fefefe
| 80519 ||  || — || January 4, 2000 || Socorro || LINEAR || NYS || align=right | 4.6 km || 
|-id=520 bgcolor=#fefefe
| 80520 ||  || — || January 4, 2000 || Socorro || LINEAR || FLO || align=right | 2.4 km || 
|-id=521 bgcolor=#fefefe
| 80521 ||  || — || January 4, 2000 || Socorro || LINEAR || — || align=right | 2.1 km || 
|-id=522 bgcolor=#fefefe
| 80522 ||  || — || January 4, 2000 || Socorro || LINEAR || — || align=right | 1.9 km || 
|-id=523 bgcolor=#fefefe
| 80523 ||  || — || January 4, 2000 || Socorro || LINEAR || NYS || align=right | 1.3 km || 
|-id=524 bgcolor=#fefefe
| 80524 ||  || — || January 4, 2000 || Socorro || LINEAR || — || align=right | 2.0 km || 
|-id=525 bgcolor=#fefefe
| 80525 ||  || — || January 4, 2000 || Socorro || LINEAR || V || align=right | 1.8 km || 
|-id=526 bgcolor=#fefefe
| 80526 ||  || — || January 4, 2000 || Socorro || LINEAR || V || align=right | 1.7 km || 
|-id=527 bgcolor=#fefefe
| 80527 ||  || — || January 4, 2000 || Socorro || LINEAR || — || align=right | 3.4 km || 
|-id=528 bgcolor=#fefefe
| 80528 ||  || — || January 4, 2000 || Socorro || LINEAR || NYS || align=right | 1.5 km || 
|-id=529 bgcolor=#fefefe
| 80529 ||  || — || January 4, 2000 || Socorro || LINEAR || — || align=right | 2.3 km || 
|-id=530 bgcolor=#fefefe
| 80530 ||  || — || January 5, 2000 || Socorro || LINEAR || — || align=right | 1.3 km || 
|-id=531 bgcolor=#fefefe
| 80531 ||  || — || January 5, 2000 || Socorro || LINEAR || ERI || align=right | 3.9 km || 
|-id=532 bgcolor=#fefefe
| 80532 ||  || — || January 5, 2000 || Socorro || LINEAR || — || align=right | 1.8 km || 
|-id=533 bgcolor=#fefefe
| 80533 ||  || — || January 5, 2000 || Socorro || LINEAR || V || align=right | 1.4 km || 
|-id=534 bgcolor=#fefefe
| 80534 ||  || — || January 5, 2000 || Socorro || LINEAR || FLO || align=right | 1.7 km || 
|-id=535 bgcolor=#fefefe
| 80535 ||  || — || January 5, 2000 || Socorro || LINEAR || — || align=right | 3.6 km || 
|-id=536 bgcolor=#fefefe
| 80536 ||  || — || January 5, 2000 || Socorro || LINEAR || — || align=right | 1.5 km || 
|-id=537 bgcolor=#fefefe
| 80537 ||  || — || January 5, 2000 || Socorro || LINEAR || — || align=right | 4.2 km || 
|-id=538 bgcolor=#fefefe
| 80538 ||  || — || January 5, 2000 || Socorro || LINEAR || NYS || align=right | 1.4 km || 
|-id=539 bgcolor=#fefefe
| 80539 ||  || — || January 5, 2000 || Socorro || LINEAR || NYS || align=right | 1.7 km || 
|-id=540 bgcolor=#fefefe
| 80540 ||  || — || January 5, 2000 || Socorro || LINEAR || — || align=right | 1.7 km || 
|-id=541 bgcolor=#fefefe
| 80541 ||  || — || January 5, 2000 || Socorro || LINEAR || — || align=right | 1.8 km || 
|-id=542 bgcolor=#fefefe
| 80542 ||  || — || January 5, 2000 || Socorro || LINEAR || V || align=right | 1.7 km || 
|-id=543 bgcolor=#fefefe
| 80543 ||  || — || January 5, 2000 || Socorro || LINEAR || — || align=right | 1.9 km || 
|-id=544 bgcolor=#fefefe
| 80544 ||  || — || January 5, 2000 || Socorro || LINEAR || MAS || align=right | 2.1 km || 
|-id=545 bgcolor=#fefefe
| 80545 ||  || — || January 5, 2000 || Socorro || LINEAR || — || align=right | 1.5 km || 
|-id=546 bgcolor=#fefefe
| 80546 ||  || — || January 5, 2000 || Socorro || LINEAR || — || align=right | 1.8 km || 
|-id=547 bgcolor=#fefefe
| 80547 ||  || — || January 5, 2000 || Socorro || LINEAR || V || align=right | 1.9 km || 
|-id=548 bgcolor=#fefefe
| 80548 ||  || — || January 5, 2000 || Socorro || LINEAR || NYS || align=right | 1.5 km || 
|-id=549 bgcolor=#fefefe
| 80549 ||  || — || January 5, 2000 || Socorro || LINEAR || — || align=right | 1.6 km || 
|-id=550 bgcolor=#fefefe
| 80550 ||  || — || January 5, 2000 || Socorro || LINEAR || — || align=right | 2.1 km || 
|-id=551 bgcolor=#fefefe
| 80551 ||  || — || January 5, 2000 || Socorro || LINEAR || FLO || align=right | 2.3 km || 
|-id=552 bgcolor=#fefefe
| 80552 ||  || — || January 5, 2000 || Socorro || LINEAR || — || align=right | 1.8 km || 
|-id=553 bgcolor=#fefefe
| 80553 ||  || — || January 5, 2000 || Socorro || LINEAR || NYS || align=right | 1.5 km || 
|-id=554 bgcolor=#fefefe
| 80554 ||  || — || January 5, 2000 || Socorro || LINEAR || — || align=right | 2.2 km || 
|-id=555 bgcolor=#fefefe
| 80555 ||  || — || January 5, 2000 || Socorro || LINEAR || FLO || align=right | 1.6 km || 
|-id=556 bgcolor=#fefefe
| 80556 ||  || — || January 4, 2000 || Socorro || LINEAR || V || align=right | 1.8 km || 
|-id=557 bgcolor=#E9E9E9
| 80557 ||  || — || January 4, 2000 || Socorro || LINEAR || — || align=right | 2.3 km || 
|-id=558 bgcolor=#fefefe
| 80558 ||  || — || January 5, 2000 || Socorro || LINEAR || V || align=right | 1.5 km || 
|-id=559 bgcolor=#fefefe
| 80559 ||  || — || January 5, 2000 || Socorro || LINEAR || — || align=right | 1.4 km || 
|-id=560 bgcolor=#fefefe
| 80560 ||  || — || January 5, 2000 || Socorro || LINEAR || — || align=right | 2.1 km || 
|-id=561 bgcolor=#fefefe
| 80561 ||  || — || January 5, 2000 || Socorro || LINEAR || — || align=right | 2.4 km || 
|-id=562 bgcolor=#fefefe
| 80562 ||  || — || January 5, 2000 || Socorro || LINEAR || — || align=right | 1.8 km || 
|-id=563 bgcolor=#fefefe
| 80563 ||  || — || January 5, 2000 || Socorro || LINEAR || — || align=right | 1.9 km || 
|-id=564 bgcolor=#fefefe
| 80564 ||  || — || January 5, 2000 || Socorro || LINEAR || — || align=right | 2.0 km || 
|-id=565 bgcolor=#fefefe
| 80565 ||  || — || January 5, 2000 || Socorro || LINEAR || — || align=right | 1.8 km || 
|-id=566 bgcolor=#fefefe
| 80566 ||  || — || January 5, 2000 || Socorro || LINEAR || — || align=right | 1.9 km || 
|-id=567 bgcolor=#fefefe
| 80567 ||  || — || January 5, 2000 || Socorro || LINEAR || V || align=right | 1.2 km || 
|-id=568 bgcolor=#fefefe
| 80568 ||  || — || January 5, 2000 || Socorro || LINEAR || — || align=right | 1.6 km || 
|-id=569 bgcolor=#fefefe
| 80569 ||  || — || January 5, 2000 || Socorro || LINEAR || — || align=right | 2.2 km || 
|-id=570 bgcolor=#fefefe
| 80570 ||  || — || January 5, 2000 || Socorro || LINEAR || — || align=right | 5.0 km || 
|-id=571 bgcolor=#fefefe
| 80571 ||  || — || January 5, 2000 || Socorro || LINEAR || V || align=right | 1.7 km || 
|-id=572 bgcolor=#fefefe
| 80572 ||  || — || January 5, 2000 || Socorro || LINEAR || — || align=right | 3.8 km || 
|-id=573 bgcolor=#fefefe
| 80573 ||  || — || January 5, 2000 || Socorro || LINEAR || — || align=right | 1.6 km || 
|-id=574 bgcolor=#E9E9E9
| 80574 ||  || — || January 5, 2000 || Socorro || LINEAR || — || align=right | 2.3 km || 
|-id=575 bgcolor=#fefefe
| 80575 ||  || — || January 5, 2000 || Socorro || LINEAR || FLO || align=right | 1.7 km || 
|-id=576 bgcolor=#fefefe
| 80576 ||  || — || January 5, 2000 || Socorro || LINEAR || — || align=right | 1.6 km || 
|-id=577 bgcolor=#fefefe
| 80577 ||  || — || January 5, 2000 || Socorro || LINEAR || V || align=right | 1.6 km || 
|-id=578 bgcolor=#fefefe
| 80578 ||  || — || January 5, 2000 || Socorro || LINEAR || V || align=right | 1.9 km || 
|-id=579 bgcolor=#fefefe
| 80579 ||  || — || January 5, 2000 || Socorro || LINEAR || V || align=right | 1.4 km || 
|-id=580 bgcolor=#fefefe
| 80580 ||  || — || January 5, 2000 || Socorro || LINEAR || — || align=right | 2.2 km || 
|-id=581 bgcolor=#fefefe
| 80581 ||  || — || January 5, 2000 || Socorro || LINEAR || — || align=right | 4.8 km || 
|-id=582 bgcolor=#fefefe
| 80582 ||  || — || January 5, 2000 || Socorro || LINEAR || V || align=right | 2.4 km || 
|-id=583 bgcolor=#fefefe
| 80583 ||  || — || January 5, 2000 || Socorro || LINEAR || — || align=right | 2.1 km || 
|-id=584 bgcolor=#fefefe
| 80584 ||  || — || January 5, 2000 || Socorro || LINEAR || V || align=right | 1.6 km || 
|-id=585 bgcolor=#fefefe
| 80585 ||  || — || January 5, 2000 || Socorro || LINEAR || ERI || align=right | 3.8 km || 
|-id=586 bgcolor=#E9E9E9
| 80586 ||  || — || January 5, 2000 || Socorro || LINEAR || — || align=right | 2.5 km || 
|-id=587 bgcolor=#fefefe
| 80587 ||  || — || January 3, 2000 || Socorro || LINEAR || NYS || align=right | 1.8 km || 
|-id=588 bgcolor=#fefefe
| 80588 ||  || — || January 3, 2000 || Socorro || LINEAR || NYS || align=right | 1.3 km || 
|-id=589 bgcolor=#fefefe
| 80589 ||  || — || January 4, 2000 || Socorro || LINEAR || — || align=right | 1.9 km || 
|-id=590 bgcolor=#fefefe
| 80590 ||  || — || January 4, 2000 || Socorro || LINEAR || — || align=right | 2.5 km || 
|-id=591 bgcolor=#fefefe
| 80591 ||  || — || January 4, 2000 || Socorro || LINEAR || ERI || align=right | 4.0 km || 
|-id=592 bgcolor=#fefefe
| 80592 ||  || — || January 5, 2000 || Socorro || LINEAR || V || align=right | 1.5 km || 
|-id=593 bgcolor=#FA8072
| 80593 ||  || — || January 5, 2000 || Socorro || LINEAR || — || align=right | 4.7 km || 
|-id=594 bgcolor=#fefefe
| 80594 ||  || — || January 5, 2000 || Socorro || LINEAR || — || align=right | 2.8 km || 
|-id=595 bgcolor=#fefefe
| 80595 ||  || — || January 6, 2000 || Socorro || LINEAR || — || align=right | 1.9 km || 
|-id=596 bgcolor=#fefefe
| 80596 ||  || — || January 7, 2000 || Socorro || LINEAR || NYS || align=right | 1.7 km || 
|-id=597 bgcolor=#fefefe
| 80597 ||  || — || January 6, 2000 || Črni Vrh || Črni Vrh || V || align=right | 1.6 km || 
|-id=598 bgcolor=#fefefe
| 80598 ||  || — || January 5, 2000 || Socorro || LINEAR || FLO || align=right | 1.2 km || 
|-id=599 bgcolor=#fefefe
| 80599 ||  || — || January 5, 2000 || Socorro || LINEAR || V || align=right | 2.4 km || 
|-id=600 bgcolor=#fefefe
| 80600 ||  || — || January 7, 2000 || Socorro || LINEAR || V || align=right | 1.7 km || 
|}

80601–80700 

|-bgcolor=#fefefe
| 80601 ||  || — || January 7, 2000 || Socorro || LINEAR || — || align=right | 2.3 km || 
|-id=602 bgcolor=#fefefe
| 80602 ||  || — || January 9, 2000 || Grasslands || J. McGaha || — || align=right | 2.7 km || 
|-id=603 bgcolor=#fefefe
| 80603 ||  || — || January 2, 2000 || Socorro || LINEAR || FLO || align=right | 1.6 km || 
|-id=604 bgcolor=#fefefe
| 80604 ||  || — || January 3, 2000 || Socorro || LINEAR || — || align=right | 1.8 km || 
|-id=605 bgcolor=#fefefe
| 80605 ||  || — || January 3, 2000 || Socorro || LINEAR || — || align=right | 2.1 km || 
|-id=606 bgcolor=#fefefe
| 80606 ||  || — || January 3, 2000 || Socorro || LINEAR || NYS || align=right | 1.4 km || 
|-id=607 bgcolor=#fefefe
| 80607 ||  || — || January 3, 2000 || Socorro || LINEAR || — || align=right | 1.9 km || 
|-id=608 bgcolor=#fefefe
| 80608 ||  || — || January 3, 2000 || Socorro || LINEAR || FLO || align=right | 2.3 km || 
|-id=609 bgcolor=#fefefe
| 80609 ||  || — || January 4, 2000 || Socorro || LINEAR || NYS || align=right | 2.2 km || 
|-id=610 bgcolor=#fefefe
| 80610 ||  || — || January 5, 2000 || Socorro || LINEAR || — || align=right | 1.7 km || 
|-id=611 bgcolor=#fefefe
| 80611 ||  || — || January 5, 2000 || Socorro || LINEAR || — || align=right | 2.0 km || 
|-id=612 bgcolor=#fefefe
| 80612 ||  || — || January 8, 2000 || Socorro || LINEAR || PHO || align=right | 2.9 km || 
|-id=613 bgcolor=#fefefe
| 80613 ||  || — || January 8, 2000 || Socorro || LINEAR || FLO || align=right | 3.5 km || 
|-id=614 bgcolor=#fefefe
| 80614 ||  || — || January 12, 2000 || Prescott || P. G. Comba || NYS || align=right | 1.3 km || 
|-id=615 bgcolor=#fefefe
| 80615 ||  || — || January 7, 2000 || Socorro || LINEAR || — || align=right | 1.9 km || 
|-id=616 bgcolor=#fefefe
| 80616 ||  || — || January 7, 2000 || Socorro || LINEAR || — || align=right | 1.8 km || 
|-id=617 bgcolor=#fefefe
| 80617 ||  || — || January 7, 2000 || Socorro || LINEAR || — || align=right | 3.1 km || 
|-id=618 bgcolor=#fefefe
| 80618 ||  || — || January 7, 2000 || Socorro || LINEAR || — || align=right | 2.6 km || 
|-id=619 bgcolor=#fefefe
| 80619 ||  || — || January 7, 2000 || Socorro || LINEAR || — || align=right | 1.9 km || 
|-id=620 bgcolor=#fefefe
| 80620 ||  || — || January 7, 2000 || Socorro || LINEAR || — || align=right | 2.4 km || 
|-id=621 bgcolor=#fefefe
| 80621 ||  || — || January 7, 2000 || Socorro || LINEAR || V || align=right | 2.0 km || 
|-id=622 bgcolor=#fefefe
| 80622 ||  || — || January 7, 2000 || Socorro || LINEAR || V || align=right | 1.5 km || 
|-id=623 bgcolor=#fefefe
| 80623 ||  || — || January 7, 2000 || Socorro || LINEAR || V || align=right | 1.3 km || 
|-id=624 bgcolor=#fefefe
| 80624 ||  || — || January 8, 2000 || Socorro || LINEAR || — || align=right | 2.0 km || 
|-id=625 bgcolor=#fefefe
| 80625 ||  || — || January 8, 2000 || Socorro || LINEAR || — || align=right | 2.5 km || 
|-id=626 bgcolor=#fefefe
| 80626 ||  || — || January 8, 2000 || Socorro || LINEAR || — || align=right | 2.3 km || 
|-id=627 bgcolor=#fefefe
| 80627 ||  || — || January 8, 2000 || Socorro || LINEAR || — || align=right | 2.0 km || 
|-id=628 bgcolor=#fefefe
| 80628 ||  || — || January 8, 2000 || Socorro || LINEAR || — || align=right | 2.3 km || 
|-id=629 bgcolor=#fefefe
| 80629 ||  || — || January 14, 2000 || Kleť || Kleť Obs. || — || align=right | 2.7 km || 
|-id=630 bgcolor=#fefefe
| 80630 ||  || — || January 14, 2000 || Kleť || Kleť Obs. || — || align=right | 2.0 km || 
|-id=631 bgcolor=#fefefe
| 80631 ||  || — || January 10, 2000 || Socorro || LINEAR || — || align=right | 2.0 km || 
|-id=632 bgcolor=#fefefe
| 80632 ||  || — || January 15, 2000 || Prescott || P. G. Comba || — || align=right | 1.5 km || 
|-id=633 bgcolor=#fefefe
| 80633 ||  || — || January 15, 2000 || Višnjan Observatory || K. Korlević || V || align=right | 1.3 km || 
|-id=634 bgcolor=#fefefe
| 80634 ||  || — || January 5, 2000 || Kitt Peak || Spacewatch || — || align=right | 1.6 km || 
|-id=635 bgcolor=#fefefe
| 80635 ||  || — || January 5, 2000 || Kitt Peak || Spacewatch || NYS || align=right | 1.4 km || 
|-id=636 bgcolor=#fefefe
| 80636 ||  || — || January 7, 2000 || Kitt Peak || Spacewatch || slow? || align=right | 1.4 km || 
|-id=637 bgcolor=#fefefe
| 80637 ||  || — || January 7, 2000 || Kitt Peak || Spacewatch || FLO || align=right | 2.7 km || 
|-id=638 bgcolor=#C2FFFF
| 80638 ||  || — || January 8, 2000 || Kitt Peak || Spacewatch || L4 || align=right | 18 km || 
|-id=639 bgcolor=#fefefe
| 80639 ||  || — || January 8, 2000 || Kitt Peak || Spacewatch || — || align=right | 1.2 km || 
|-id=640 bgcolor=#fefefe
| 80640 ||  || — || January 8, 2000 || Kitt Peak || Spacewatch || FLO || align=right | 2.2 km || 
|-id=641 bgcolor=#fefefe
| 80641 ||  || — || January 8, 2000 || Kitt Peak || Spacewatch || — || align=right | 1.9 km || 
|-id=642 bgcolor=#fefefe
| 80642 ||  || — || January 9, 2000 || Kitt Peak || Spacewatch || V || align=right | 1.6 km || 
|-id=643 bgcolor=#fefefe
| 80643 ||  || — || January 9, 2000 || Kitt Peak || Spacewatch || — || align=right | 1.7 km || 
|-id=644 bgcolor=#fefefe
| 80644 ||  || — || January 9, 2000 || Kitt Peak || Spacewatch || NYS || align=right | 1.4 km || 
|-id=645 bgcolor=#fefefe
| 80645 ||  || — || January 10, 2000 || Kitt Peak || Spacewatch || — || align=right | 2.4 km || 
|-id=646 bgcolor=#fefefe
| 80646 ||  || — || January 4, 2000 || Socorro || LINEAR || — || align=right | 2.5 km || 
|-id=647 bgcolor=#E9E9E9
| 80647 ||  || — || January 6, 2000 || Socorro || LINEAR || EUN || align=right | 2.7 km || 
|-id=648 bgcolor=#fefefe
| 80648 ||  || — || January 6, 2000 || Socorro || LINEAR || — || align=right | 1.7 km || 
|-id=649 bgcolor=#fefefe
| 80649 ||  || — || January 6, 2000 || Socorro || LINEAR || NYS || align=right | 1.7 km || 
|-id=650 bgcolor=#fefefe
| 80650 ||  || — || January 5, 2000 || Socorro || LINEAR || — || align=right | 2.2 km || 
|-id=651 bgcolor=#fefefe
| 80651 ||  || — || January 4, 2000 || Socorro || LINEAR || NYS || align=right | 1.4 km || 
|-id=652 bgcolor=#fefefe
| 80652 Albertoangela || 2000 BB ||  || January 16, 2000 || Cavezzo || Cavezzo Obs. || — || align=right | 1.9 km || 
|-id=653 bgcolor=#fefefe
| 80653 ||  || — || January 27, 2000 || Kitt Peak || Spacewatch || NYS || align=right | 1.4 km || 
|-id=654 bgcolor=#fefefe
| 80654 ||  || — || January 25, 2000 || Višnjan Observatory || K. Korlević || FLO || align=right | 2.6 km || 
|-id=655 bgcolor=#fefefe
| 80655 ||  || — || January 27, 2000 || Oizumi || T. Kobayashi || V || align=right | 1.9 km || 
|-id=656 bgcolor=#fefefe
| 80656 ||  || — || January 29, 2000 || Socorro || LINEAR || — || align=right | 1.8 km || 
|-id=657 bgcolor=#fefefe
| 80657 ||  || — || January 29, 2000 || Socorro || LINEAR || — || align=right | 2.2 km || 
|-id=658 bgcolor=#fefefe
| 80658 ||  || — || January 29, 2000 || Socorro || LINEAR || — || align=right | 1.8 km || 
|-id=659 bgcolor=#fefefe
| 80659 ||  || — || January 26, 2000 || Kitt Peak || Spacewatch || MAS || align=right | 1.4 km || 
|-id=660 bgcolor=#E9E9E9
| 80660 ||  || — || January 26, 2000 || Kitt Peak || Spacewatch || — || align=right | 3.4 km || 
|-id=661 bgcolor=#fefefe
| 80661 ||  || — || January 26, 2000 || Kitt Peak || Spacewatch || — || align=right | 4.2 km || 
|-id=662 bgcolor=#fefefe
| 80662 ||  || — || January 28, 2000 || Kitt Peak || Spacewatch || FLO || align=right | 1.8 km || 
|-id=663 bgcolor=#fefefe
| 80663 ||  || — || January 28, 2000 || Les Tardieux Obs. || M. Boeuf || V || align=right | 1.6 km || 
|-id=664 bgcolor=#fefefe
| 80664 ||  || — || January 26, 2000 || Dynic || A. Sugie || — || align=right | 2.0 km || 
|-id=665 bgcolor=#fefefe
| 80665 ||  || — || January 28, 2000 || Gekko || T. Kagawa || — || align=right | 1.7 km || 
|-id=666 bgcolor=#fefefe
| 80666 ||  || — || January 28, 2000 || Oizumi || T. Kobayashi || — || align=right | 2.6 km || 
|-id=667 bgcolor=#fefefe
| 80667 ||  || — || January 31, 2000 || Oizumi || T. Kobayashi || — || align=right | 2.8 km || 
|-id=668 bgcolor=#fefefe
| 80668 ||  || — || January 31, 2000 || Oizumi || T. Kobayashi || — || align=right | 2.0 km || 
|-id=669 bgcolor=#fefefe
| 80669 ||  || — || January 29, 2000 || Socorro || LINEAR || — || align=right | 2.1 km || 
|-id=670 bgcolor=#fefefe
| 80670 ||  || — || January 29, 2000 || Socorro || LINEAR || V || align=right | 1.6 km || 
|-id=671 bgcolor=#fefefe
| 80671 ||  || — || January 30, 2000 || Socorro || LINEAR || FLO || align=right | 1.7 km || 
|-id=672 bgcolor=#fefefe
| 80672 ||  || — || January 30, 2000 || Socorro || LINEAR || FLO || align=right | 1.6 km || 
|-id=673 bgcolor=#fefefe
| 80673 ||  || — || January 30, 2000 || Socorro || LINEAR || V || align=right | 1.5 km || 
|-id=674 bgcolor=#fefefe
| 80674 ||  || — || January 26, 2000 || Kitt Peak || Spacewatch || NYS || align=right | 1.4 km || 
|-id=675 bgcolor=#fefefe
| 80675 Kwentus ||  ||  || January 30, 2000 || Catalina || CSS || — || align=right | 2.3 km || 
|-id=676 bgcolor=#fefefe
| 80676 ||  || — || January 30, 2000 || Socorro || LINEAR || — || align=right | 2.5 km || 
|-id=677 bgcolor=#fefefe
| 80677 ||  || — || January 29, 2000 || Kitt Peak || Spacewatch || MAS || align=right | 1.4 km || 
|-id=678 bgcolor=#fefefe
| 80678 ||  || — || January 30, 2000 || Socorro || LINEAR || V || align=right | 1.8 km || 
|-id=679 bgcolor=#fefefe
| 80679 ||  || — || January 30, 2000 || Socorro || LINEAR || fast? || align=right | 1.9 km || 
|-id=680 bgcolor=#fefefe
| 80680 ||  || — || January 30, 2000 || Socorro || LINEAR || NYS || align=right | 1.5 km || 
|-id=681 bgcolor=#fefefe
| 80681 ||  || — || January 30, 2000 || Socorro || LINEAR || — || align=right | 2.8 km || 
|-id=682 bgcolor=#fefefe
| 80682 ||  || — || January 27, 2000 || Višnjan Observatory || K. Korlević || NYS || align=right | 1.0 km || 
|-id=683 bgcolor=#fefefe
| 80683 ||  || — || January 28, 2000 || Kitt Peak || Spacewatch || — || align=right | 1.7 km || 
|-id=684 bgcolor=#fefefe
| 80684 ||  || — || January 28, 2000 || Kitt Peak || Spacewatch || V || align=right | 1.7 km || 
|-id=685 bgcolor=#fefefe
| 80685 ||  || — || January 29, 2000 || Kitt Peak || Spacewatch || — || align=right | 1.7 km || 
|-id=686 bgcolor=#fefefe
| 80686 ||  || — || January 30, 2000 || Catalina || CSS || V || align=right | 1.8 km || 
|-id=687 bgcolor=#E9E9E9
| 80687 ||  || — || January 30, 2000 || Catalina || CSS || — || align=right | 1.8 km || 
|-id=688 bgcolor=#fefefe
| 80688 ||  || — || January 30, 2000 || Catalina || CSS || — || align=right | 2.4 km || 
|-id=689 bgcolor=#fefefe
| 80689 ||  || — || January 31, 2000 || Socorro || LINEAR || — || align=right | 1.9 km || 
|-id=690 bgcolor=#fefefe
| 80690 ||  || — || January 27, 2000 || Kitt Peak || Spacewatch || MAS || align=right | 1.0 km || 
|-id=691 bgcolor=#E9E9E9
| 80691 ||  || — || January 27, 2000 || Kitt Peak || Spacewatch || — || align=right | 2.2 km || 
|-id=692 bgcolor=#fefefe
| 80692 || 2000 CD || — || February 2, 2000 || Tebbutt || F. B. Zoltowski || — || align=right | 2.6 km || 
|-id=693 bgcolor=#fefefe
| 80693 || 2000 CH || — || February 1, 2000 || Prescott || P. G. Comba || — || align=right | 2.3 km || 
|-id=694 bgcolor=#fefefe
| 80694 || 2000 CN || — || February 2, 2000 || Prescott || P. G. Comba || — || align=right | 1.6 km || 
|-id=695 bgcolor=#E9E9E9
| 80695 || 2000 CP || — || February 2, 2000 || Prescott || P. G. Comba || MRX || align=right | 2.3 km || 
|-id=696 bgcolor=#fefefe
| 80696 ||  || — || February 3, 2000 || Višnjan Observatory || K. Korlević || — || align=right | 2.4 km || 
|-id=697 bgcolor=#fefefe
| 80697 ||  || — || February 3, 2000 || Višnjan Observatory || K. Korlević || EUT || align=right | 1.2 km || 
|-id=698 bgcolor=#fefefe
| 80698 ||  || — || February 4, 2000 || Baton Rouge || W. R. Cooney Jr. || — || align=right | 2.4 km || 
|-id=699 bgcolor=#fefefe
| 80699 ||  || — || February 4, 2000 || Višnjan Observatory || K. Korlević || NYS || align=right | 1.9 km || 
|-id=700 bgcolor=#fefefe
| 80700 ||  || — || February 2, 2000 || Uenohara || N. Kawasato || — || align=right | 3.4 km || 
|}

80701–80800 

|-bgcolor=#fefefe
| 80701 ||  || — || February 2, 2000 || Socorro || LINEAR || NYS || align=right | 1.4 km || 
|-id=702 bgcolor=#fefefe
| 80702 ||  || — || February 2, 2000 || Socorro || LINEAR || — || align=right | 2.3 km || 
|-id=703 bgcolor=#E9E9E9
| 80703 ||  || — || February 2, 2000 || Socorro || LINEAR || — || align=right | 3.9 km || 
|-id=704 bgcolor=#fefefe
| 80704 ||  || — || February 2, 2000 || Socorro || LINEAR || V || align=right | 1.4 km || 
|-id=705 bgcolor=#fefefe
| 80705 ||  || — || February 2, 2000 || Socorro || LINEAR || NYS || align=right | 1.7 km || 
|-id=706 bgcolor=#fefefe
| 80706 ||  || — || February 2, 2000 || Socorro || LINEAR || NYS || align=right | 2.0 km || 
|-id=707 bgcolor=#fefefe
| 80707 ||  || — || February 2, 2000 || Socorro || LINEAR || NYS || align=right | 1.4 km || 
|-id=708 bgcolor=#fefefe
| 80708 ||  || — || February 2, 2000 || Socorro || LINEAR || V || align=right | 1.4 km || 
|-id=709 bgcolor=#fefefe
| 80709 ||  || — || February 2, 2000 || Socorro || LINEAR || — || align=right | 1.8 km || 
|-id=710 bgcolor=#fefefe
| 80710 ||  || — || February 2, 2000 || Socorro || LINEAR || — || align=right | 2.2 km || 
|-id=711 bgcolor=#fefefe
| 80711 ||  || — || February 2, 2000 || Socorro || LINEAR || — || align=right | 1.6 km || 
|-id=712 bgcolor=#E9E9E9
| 80712 ||  || — || February 2, 2000 || Socorro || LINEAR || — || align=right | 2.0 km || 
|-id=713 bgcolor=#fefefe
| 80713 ||  || — || February 2, 2000 || Socorro || LINEAR || NYS || align=right | 1.5 km || 
|-id=714 bgcolor=#fefefe
| 80714 ||  || — || February 2, 2000 || Socorro || LINEAR || NYS || align=right | 1.4 km || 
|-id=715 bgcolor=#fefefe
| 80715 ||  || — || February 2, 2000 || Socorro || LINEAR || V || align=right | 1.5 km || 
|-id=716 bgcolor=#fefefe
| 80716 ||  || — || February 2, 2000 || Socorro || LINEAR || — || align=right | 1.8 km || 
|-id=717 bgcolor=#fefefe
| 80717 ||  || — || February 2, 2000 || Socorro || LINEAR || — || align=right | 1.9 km || 
|-id=718 bgcolor=#fefefe
| 80718 ||  || — || February 2, 2000 || Socorro || LINEAR || NYS || align=right | 1.5 km || 
|-id=719 bgcolor=#E9E9E9
| 80719 ||  || — || February 2, 2000 || Socorro || LINEAR || — || align=right | 3.1 km || 
|-id=720 bgcolor=#fefefe
| 80720 ||  || — || February 2, 2000 || Socorro || LINEAR || NYS || align=right | 1.6 km || 
|-id=721 bgcolor=#fefefe
| 80721 ||  || — || February 2, 2000 || Socorro || LINEAR || — || align=right | 2.4 km || 
|-id=722 bgcolor=#fefefe
| 80722 ||  || — || February 2, 2000 || Socorro || LINEAR || V || align=right | 1.0 km || 
|-id=723 bgcolor=#fefefe
| 80723 ||  || — || February 2, 2000 || Socorro || LINEAR || — || align=right | 1.9 km || 
|-id=724 bgcolor=#fefefe
| 80724 ||  || — || February 2, 2000 || Socorro || LINEAR || — || align=right | 2.4 km || 
|-id=725 bgcolor=#fefefe
| 80725 ||  || — || February 2, 2000 || Socorro || LINEAR || NYS || align=right | 1.3 km || 
|-id=726 bgcolor=#fefefe
| 80726 ||  || — || February 2, 2000 || Socorro || LINEAR || MAS || align=right | 1.5 km || 
|-id=727 bgcolor=#fefefe
| 80727 ||  || — || February 2, 2000 || Socorro || LINEAR || NYS || align=right | 1.5 km || 
|-id=728 bgcolor=#fefefe
| 80728 ||  || — || February 2, 2000 || Socorro || LINEAR || NYS || align=right | 2.0 km || 
|-id=729 bgcolor=#fefefe
| 80729 ||  || — || February 2, 2000 || Socorro || LINEAR || NYS || align=right | 1.6 km || 
|-id=730 bgcolor=#fefefe
| 80730 ||  || — || February 2, 2000 || Socorro || LINEAR || — || align=right | 2.1 km || 
|-id=731 bgcolor=#fefefe
| 80731 ||  || — || February 2, 2000 || Socorro || LINEAR || — || align=right | 2.0 km || 
|-id=732 bgcolor=#E9E9E9
| 80732 ||  || — || February 2, 2000 || Socorro || LINEAR || — || align=right | 2.3 km || 
|-id=733 bgcolor=#E9E9E9
| 80733 ||  || — || February 2, 2000 || Socorro || LINEAR || — || align=right | 3.0 km || 
|-id=734 bgcolor=#fefefe
| 80734 ||  || — || February 2, 2000 || Socorro || LINEAR || — || align=right | 2.8 km || 
|-id=735 bgcolor=#fefefe
| 80735 ||  || — || February 2, 2000 || Socorro || LINEAR || — || align=right | 2.7 km || 
|-id=736 bgcolor=#fefefe
| 80736 ||  || — || February 2, 2000 || Socorro || LINEAR || — || align=right | 2.0 km || 
|-id=737 bgcolor=#fefefe
| 80737 ||  || — || February 2, 2000 || Socorro || LINEAR || — || align=right | 1.7 km || 
|-id=738 bgcolor=#fefefe
| 80738 ||  || — || February 4, 2000 || Višnjan Observatory || K. Korlević || NYS || align=right | 2.2 km || 
|-id=739 bgcolor=#fefefe
| 80739 ||  || — || February 5, 2000 || Višnjan Observatory || K. Korlević || — || align=right | 2.2 km || 
|-id=740 bgcolor=#fefefe
| 80740 ||  || — || February 2, 2000 || Socorro || LINEAR || FLO || align=right | 1.7 km || 
|-id=741 bgcolor=#E9E9E9
| 80741 ||  || — || February 2, 2000 || Socorro || LINEAR || — || align=right | 2.5 km || 
|-id=742 bgcolor=#fefefe
| 80742 ||  || — || February 2, 2000 || Socorro || LINEAR || NYS || align=right | 1.7 km || 
|-id=743 bgcolor=#fefefe
| 80743 ||  || — || February 3, 2000 || Socorro || LINEAR || MAS || align=right | 1.5 km || 
|-id=744 bgcolor=#fefefe
| 80744 ||  || — || February 3, 2000 || Socorro || LINEAR || FLO || align=right | 2.0 km || 
|-id=745 bgcolor=#fefefe
| 80745 ||  || — || February 4, 2000 || Socorro || LINEAR || FLO || align=right | 1.9 km || 
|-id=746 bgcolor=#fefefe
| 80746 ||  || — || February 2, 2000 || Socorro || LINEAR || NYS || align=right | 1.5 km || 
|-id=747 bgcolor=#fefefe
| 80747 ||  || — || February 2, 2000 || Socorro || LINEAR || V || align=right | 1.3 km || 
|-id=748 bgcolor=#fefefe
| 80748 ||  || — || February 2, 2000 || Socorro || LINEAR || V || align=right | 1.4 km || 
|-id=749 bgcolor=#fefefe
| 80749 ||  || — || February 2, 2000 || Socorro || LINEAR || — || align=right | 2.9 km || 
|-id=750 bgcolor=#fefefe
| 80750 ||  || — || February 2, 2000 || Socorro || LINEAR || — || align=right | 2.3 km || 
|-id=751 bgcolor=#fefefe
| 80751 ||  || — || February 2, 2000 || Socorro || LINEAR || V || align=right | 1.7 km || 
|-id=752 bgcolor=#fefefe
| 80752 ||  || — || February 2, 2000 || Socorro || LINEAR || — || align=right | 1.5 km || 
|-id=753 bgcolor=#fefefe
| 80753 ||  || — || February 2, 2000 || Socorro || LINEAR || — || align=right | 2.0 km || 
|-id=754 bgcolor=#fefefe
| 80754 ||  || — || February 2, 2000 || Socorro || LINEAR || KLI || align=right | 4.9 km || 
|-id=755 bgcolor=#fefefe
| 80755 ||  || — || February 2, 2000 || Socorro || LINEAR || — || align=right | 2.1 km || 
|-id=756 bgcolor=#fefefe
| 80756 ||  || — || February 2, 2000 || Socorro || LINEAR || — || align=right | 1.8 km || 
|-id=757 bgcolor=#fefefe
| 80757 ||  || — || February 2, 2000 || Socorro || LINEAR || — || align=right | 5.3 km || 
|-id=758 bgcolor=#fefefe
| 80758 ||  || — || February 2, 2000 || Socorro || LINEAR || — || align=right | 3.0 km || 
|-id=759 bgcolor=#fefefe
| 80759 ||  || — || February 2, 2000 || Socorro || LINEAR || MAS || align=right | 4.3 km || 
|-id=760 bgcolor=#fefefe
| 80760 ||  || — || February 2, 2000 || Socorro || LINEAR || — || align=right | 1.8 km || 
|-id=761 bgcolor=#fefefe
| 80761 ||  || — || February 2, 2000 || Socorro || LINEAR || NYS || align=right | 1.6 km || 
|-id=762 bgcolor=#E9E9E9
| 80762 ||  || — || February 2, 2000 || Socorro || LINEAR || — || align=right | 3.5 km || 
|-id=763 bgcolor=#fefefe
| 80763 ||  || — || February 4, 2000 || Socorro || LINEAR || — || align=right | 1.6 km || 
|-id=764 bgcolor=#fefefe
| 80764 ||  || — || February 4, 2000 || Socorro || LINEAR || — || align=right | 2.0 km || 
|-id=765 bgcolor=#fefefe
| 80765 ||  || — || February 5, 2000 || Socorro || LINEAR || FLO || align=right | 1.5 km || 
|-id=766 bgcolor=#fefefe
| 80766 ||  || — || February 5, 2000 || Socorro || LINEAR || NYS || align=right | 1.6 km || 
|-id=767 bgcolor=#fefefe
| 80767 ||  || — || February 2, 2000 || Socorro || LINEAR || V || align=right | 1.4 km || 
|-id=768 bgcolor=#fefefe
| 80768 ||  || — || February 2, 2000 || Socorro || LINEAR || V || align=right | 1.8 km || 
|-id=769 bgcolor=#fefefe
| 80769 ||  || — || February 2, 2000 || Socorro || LINEAR || V || align=right | 2.1 km || 
|-id=770 bgcolor=#E9E9E9
| 80770 ||  || — || February 2, 2000 || Socorro || LINEAR || — || align=right | 9.0 km || 
|-id=771 bgcolor=#fefefe
| 80771 ||  || — || February 2, 2000 || Socorro || LINEAR || — || align=right | 2.7 km || 
|-id=772 bgcolor=#fefefe
| 80772 ||  || — || February 2, 2000 || Socorro || LINEAR || — || align=right | 2.4 km || 
|-id=773 bgcolor=#d6d6d6
| 80773 ||  || — || February 2, 2000 || Socorro || LINEAR || — || align=right | 9.9 km || 
|-id=774 bgcolor=#E9E9E9
| 80774 ||  || — || February 2, 2000 || Socorro || LINEAR || BRU || align=right | 6.6 km || 
|-id=775 bgcolor=#fefefe
| 80775 ||  || — || February 4, 2000 || Socorro || LINEAR || V || align=right | 1.4 km || 
|-id=776 bgcolor=#fefefe
| 80776 ||  || — || February 4, 2000 || Socorro || LINEAR || — || align=right | 5.2 km || 
|-id=777 bgcolor=#fefefe
| 80777 ||  || — || February 6, 2000 || Socorro || LINEAR || ERI || align=right | 3.4 km || 
|-id=778 bgcolor=#fefefe
| 80778 ||  || — || February 1, 2000 || Kitt Peak || Spacewatch || NYS || align=right | 1.4 km || 
|-id=779 bgcolor=#fefefe
| 80779 ||  || — || February 10, 2000 || Višnjan Observatory || K. Korlević || NYS || align=right | 1.7 km || 
|-id=780 bgcolor=#fefefe
| 80780 ||  || — || February 8, 2000 || Prescott || P. G. Comba || — || align=right | 2.4 km || 
|-id=781 bgcolor=#fefefe
| 80781 ||  || — || February 7, 2000 || Kitt Peak || Spacewatch || MAS || align=right | 1.6 km || 
|-id=782 bgcolor=#fefefe
| 80782 ||  || — || February 7, 2000 || Kitt Peak || Spacewatch || NYS || align=right | 1.7 km || 
|-id=783 bgcolor=#fefefe
| 80783 ||  || — || February 8, 2000 || Kitt Peak || Spacewatch || — || align=right | 2.5 km || 
|-id=784 bgcolor=#fefefe
| 80784 ||  || — || February 8, 2000 || Kitt Peak || Spacewatch || — || align=right | 1.8 km || 
|-id=785 bgcolor=#fefefe
| 80785 ||  || — || February 4, 2000 || Socorro || LINEAR || — || align=right | 1.9 km || 
|-id=786 bgcolor=#fefefe
| 80786 ||  || — || February 4, 2000 || Socorro || LINEAR || — || align=right | 2.5 km || 
|-id=787 bgcolor=#E9E9E9
| 80787 ||  || — || February 4, 2000 || Socorro || LINEAR || — || align=right | 2.7 km || 
|-id=788 bgcolor=#fefefe
| 80788 ||  || — || February 4, 2000 || Socorro || LINEAR || — || align=right | 1.9 km || 
|-id=789 bgcolor=#fefefe
| 80789 ||  || — || February 4, 2000 || Socorro || LINEAR || NYS || align=right | 4.9 km || 
|-id=790 bgcolor=#fefefe
| 80790 ||  || — || February 4, 2000 || Socorro || LINEAR || MAS || align=right | 1.7 km || 
|-id=791 bgcolor=#E9E9E9
| 80791 ||  || — || February 4, 2000 || Socorro || LINEAR || — || align=right | 1.9 km || 
|-id=792 bgcolor=#fefefe
| 80792 ||  || — || February 4, 2000 || Socorro || LINEAR || — || align=right | 7.4 km || 
|-id=793 bgcolor=#fefefe
| 80793 ||  || — || February 4, 2000 || Socorro || LINEAR || — || align=right | 2.4 km || 
|-id=794 bgcolor=#fefefe
| 80794 ||  || — || February 4, 2000 || Socorro || LINEAR || MAS || align=right | 1.4 km || 
|-id=795 bgcolor=#fefefe
| 80795 ||  || — || February 4, 2000 || Socorro || LINEAR || V || align=right | 1.4 km || 
|-id=796 bgcolor=#fefefe
| 80796 ||  || — || February 4, 2000 || Socorro || LINEAR || MAS || align=right | 1.6 km || 
|-id=797 bgcolor=#fefefe
| 80797 ||  || — || February 4, 2000 || Socorro || LINEAR || — || align=right | 2.1 km || 
|-id=798 bgcolor=#fefefe
| 80798 ||  || — || February 4, 2000 || Socorro || LINEAR || V || align=right | 2.1 km || 
|-id=799 bgcolor=#fefefe
| 80799 ||  || — || February 8, 2000 || Socorro || LINEAR || — || align=right | 1.9 km || 
|-id=800 bgcolor=#fefefe
| 80800 ||  || — || February 6, 2000 || Socorro || LINEAR || V || align=right | 1.7 km || 
|}

80801–80900 

|-bgcolor=#fefefe
| 80801 Yiwu ||  ||  || February 8, 2000 || Kitt Peak || Spacewatch || MAS || align=right | 1.5 km || 
|-id=802 bgcolor=#fefefe
| 80802 ||  || — || February 8, 2000 || Kitt Peak || Spacewatch || — || align=right | 2.5 km || 
|-id=803 bgcolor=#fefefe
| 80803 ||  || — || February 12, 2000 || Kitt Peak || Spacewatch || — || align=right | 1.9 km || 
|-id=804 bgcolor=#fefefe
| 80804 ||  || — || February 2, 2000 || Socorro || LINEAR || — || align=right | 1.8 km || 
|-id=805 bgcolor=#fefefe
| 80805 ||  || — || February 8, 2000 || Socorro || LINEAR || V || align=right | 1.9 km || 
|-id=806 bgcolor=#C2E0FF
| 80806 ||  || — || February 6, 2000 || Kitt Peak || M. W. Buie || cubewano (cold)mooncritical || align=right | 204 km || 
|-id=807 bgcolor=#fefefe
| 80807 Jimloudon ||  ||  || February 7, 2000 || Catalina || CSS || — || align=right | 2.7 km || 
|-id=808 bgcolor=#E9E9E9
| 80808 Billmason ||  ||  || February 1, 2000 || Catalina || CSS || — || align=right | 2.2 km || 
|-id=809 bgcolor=#E9E9E9
| 80809 ||  || — || February 1, 2000 || Kitt Peak || Spacewatch || GER || align=right | 1.9 km || 
|-id=810 bgcolor=#d6d6d6
| 80810 Georgewinters ||  ||  || February 1, 2000 || Catalina || CSS || BRA || align=right | 3.4 km || 
|-id=811 bgcolor=#fefefe
| 80811 ||  || — || February 3, 2000 || Socorro || LINEAR || NYS || align=right | 1.4 km || 
|-id=812 bgcolor=#E9E9E9
| 80812 ||  || — || February 3, 2000 || Socorro || LINEAR || — || align=right | 3.2 km || 
|-id=813 bgcolor=#fefefe
| 80813 ||  || — || February 2, 2000 || Socorro || LINEAR || — || align=right | 3.4 km || 
|-id=814 bgcolor=#fefefe
| 80814 ||  || — || February 3, 2000 || Socorro || LINEAR || — || align=right | 1.9 km || 
|-id=815 bgcolor=#fefefe
| 80815 ||  || — || February 3, 2000 || Socorro || LINEAR || — || align=right | 4.5 km || 
|-id=816 bgcolor=#fefefe
| 80816 ||  || — || February 3, 2000 || Socorro || LINEAR || FLO || align=right | 2.2 km || 
|-id=817 bgcolor=#fefefe
| 80817 ||  || — || February 3, 2000 || Socorro || LINEAR || NYS || align=right | 1.6 km || 
|-id=818 bgcolor=#fefefe
| 80818 ||  || — || February 3, 2000 || Socorro || LINEAR || — || align=right | 1.7 km || 
|-id=819 bgcolor=#fefefe
| 80819 ||  || — || February 3, 2000 || Socorro || LINEAR || FLO || align=right | 1.6 km || 
|-id=820 bgcolor=#fefefe
| 80820 ||  || — || February 3, 2000 || Kitt Peak || Spacewatch || — || align=right | 1.3 km || 
|-id=821 bgcolor=#E9E9E9
| 80821 ||  || — || February 4, 2000 || Kitt Peak || Spacewatch || — || align=right | 1.5 km || 
|-id=822 bgcolor=#E9E9E9
| 80822 ||  || — || February 4, 2000 || Kitt Peak || Spacewatch || — || align=right | 2.5 km || 
|-id=823 bgcolor=#fefefe
| 80823 || 2000 DP || — || February 23, 2000 || Višnjan Observatory || K. Korlević || NYS || align=right | 2.6 km || 
|-id=824 bgcolor=#fefefe
| 80824 || 2000 DX || — || February 24, 2000 || Oizumi || T. Kobayashi || — || align=right | 1.9 km || 
|-id=825 bgcolor=#fefefe
| 80825 || 2000 DZ || — || February 24, 2000 || Oizumi || T. Kobayashi || — || align=right | 3.1 km || 
|-id=826 bgcolor=#fefefe
| 80826 ||  || — || February 26, 2000 || Rock Finder || W. K. Y. Yeung || — || align=right | 3.5 km || 
|-id=827 bgcolor=#fefefe
| 80827 ||  || — || February 26, 2000 || Kitt Peak || Spacewatch || EUT || align=right | 1.1 km || 
|-id=828 bgcolor=#E9E9E9
| 80828 ||  || — || February 26, 2000 || Kitt Peak || Spacewatch || ADE || align=right | 7.0 km || 
|-id=829 bgcolor=#fefefe
| 80829 ||  || — || February 27, 2000 || Kitt Peak || Spacewatch || — || align=right | 1.9 km || 
|-id=830 bgcolor=#E9E9E9
| 80830 ||  || — || February 25, 2000 || Socorro || LINEAR || — || align=right | 3.2 km || 
|-id=831 bgcolor=#fefefe
| 80831 ||  || — || February 28, 2000 || Socorro || LINEAR || — || align=right | 3.4 km || 
|-id=832 bgcolor=#fefefe
| 80832 ||  || — || February 28, 2000 || Socorro || LINEAR || — || align=right | 2.3 km || 
|-id=833 bgcolor=#fefefe
| 80833 ||  || — || February 25, 2000 || Socorro || LINEAR || — || align=right | 2.2 km || 
|-id=834 bgcolor=#fefefe
| 80834 ||  || — || February 25, 2000 || Socorro || LINEAR || — || align=right | 2.0 km || 
|-id=835 bgcolor=#fefefe
| 80835 ||  || — || February 29, 2000 || Oizumi || T. Kobayashi || — || align=right | 3.9 km || 
|-id=836 bgcolor=#fefefe
| 80836 ||  || — || February 28, 2000 || Kitt Peak || Spacewatch || — || align=right | 1.8 km || 
|-id=837 bgcolor=#fefefe
| 80837 ||  || — || February 28, 2000 || Kitt Peak || Spacewatch || — || align=right | 1.2 km || 
|-id=838 bgcolor=#fefefe
| 80838 ||  || — || February 27, 2000 || Kitt Peak || Spacewatch || V || align=right | 1.6 km || 
|-id=839 bgcolor=#E9E9E9
| 80839 ||  || — || February 27, 2000 || Kitt Peak || Spacewatch || HEN || align=right | 1.7 km || 
|-id=840 bgcolor=#E9E9E9
| 80840 ||  || — || February 28, 2000 || Kitt Peak || Spacewatch || — || align=right | 1.7 km || 
|-id=841 bgcolor=#fefefe
| 80841 ||  || — || February 25, 2000 || Catalina || CSS || — || align=right | 2.1 km || 
|-id=842 bgcolor=#fefefe
| 80842 ||  || — || February 26, 2000 || Catalina || CSS || — || align=right | 2.8 km || 
|-id=843 bgcolor=#E9E9E9
| 80843 ||  || — || February 29, 2000 || Socorro || LINEAR || HNS || align=right | 2.6 km || 
|-id=844 bgcolor=#fefefe
| 80844 ||  || — || February 28, 2000 || Socorro || LINEAR || NYS || align=right | 1.4 km || 
|-id=845 bgcolor=#E9E9E9
| 80845 ||  || — || February 29, 2000 || Socorro || LINEAR || — || align=right | 4.3 km || 
|-id=846 bgcolor=#fefefe
| 80846 ||  || — || February 29, 2000 || Socorro || LINEAR || — || align=right | 2.2 km || 
|-id=847 bgcolor=#fefefe
| 80847 ||  || — || February 29, 2000 || Socorro || LINEAR || — || align=right | 1.4 km || 
|-id=848 bgcolor=#fefefe
| 80848 ||  || — || February 29, 2000 || Socorro || LINEAR || NYS || align=right | 1.7 km || 
|-id=849 bgcolor=#fefefe
| 80849 ||  || — || February 29, 2000 || Socorro || LINEAR || NYS || align=right | 1.3 km || 
|-id=850 bgcolor=#fefefe
| 80850 ||  || — || February 29, 2000 || Socorro || LINEAR || FLO || align=right | 1.6 km || 
|-id=851 bgcolor=#E9E9E9
| 80851 ||  || — || February 29, 2000 || Socorro || LINEAR || — || align=right | 1.9 km || 
|-id=852 bgcolor=#fefefe
| 80852 ||  || — || February 29, 2000 || Socorro || LINEAR || NYS || align=right | 1.3 km || 
|-id=853 bgcolor=#E9E9E9
| 80853 ||  || — || February 29, 2000 || Socorro || LINEAR || — || align=right | 1.7 km || 
|-id=854 bgcolor=#fefefe
| 80854 ||  || — || February 29, 2000 || Socorro || LINEAR || — || align=right | 1.9 km || 
|-id=855 bgcolor=#E9E9E9
| 80855 ||  || — || February 29, 2000 || Socorro || LINEAR || — || align=right | 2.4 km || 
|-id=856 bgcolor=#fefefe
| 80856 ||  || — || February 29, 2000 || Socorro || LINEAR || V || align=right | 1.6 km || 
|-id=857 bgcolor=#fefefe
| 80857 ||  || — || February 29, 2000 || Socorro || LINEAR || — || align=right | 2.8 km || 
|-id=858 bgcolor=#fefefe
| 80858 ||  || — || February 29, 2000 || Socorro || LINEAR || NYS || align=right | 1.4 km || 
|-id=859 bgcolor=#fefefe
| 80859 ||  || — || February 29, 2000 || Socorro || LINEAR || — || align=right | 2.1 km || 
|-id=860 bgcolor=#fefefe
| 80860 ||  || — || February 29, 2000 || Socorro || LINEAR || V || align=right | 2.2 km || 
|-id=861 bgcolor=#fefefe
| 80861 ||  || — || February 29, 2000 || Socorro || LINEAR || MAS || align=right | 1.6 km || 
|-id=862 bgcolor=#fefefe
| 80862 ||  || — || February 29, 2000 || Socorro || LINEAR || — || align=right | 1.7 km || 
|-id=863 bgcolor=#fefefe
| 80863 ||  || — || February 29, 2000 || Socorro || LINEAR || — || align=right | 2.2 km || 
|-id=864 bgcolor=#fefefe
| 80864 ||  || — || February 29, 2000 || Socorro || LINEAR || — || align=right | 1.8 km || 
|-id=865 bgcolor=#fefefe
| 80865 ||  || — || February 29, 2000 || Socorro || LINEAR || MAS || align=right | 1.9 km || 
|-id=866 bgcolor=#fefefe
| 80866 ||  || — || February 29, 2000 || Socorro || LINEAR || MAS || align=right | 1.9 km || 
|-id=867 bgcolor=#fefefe
| 80867 ||  || — || February 29, 2000 || Socorro || LINEAR || MAS || align=right | 1.6 km || 
|-id=868 bgcolor=#fefefe
| 80868 ||  || — || February 29, 2000 || Socorro || LINEAR || MAS || align=right | 1.2 km || 
|-id=869 bgcolor=#E9E9E9
| 80869 ||  || — || February 29, 2000 || Socorro || LINEAR || — || align=right | 2.0 km || 
|-id=870 bgcolor=#fefefe
| 80870 ||  || — || February 29, 2000 || Socorro || LINEAR || — || align=right | 2.0 km || 
|-id=871 bgcolor=#fefefe
| 80871 ||  || — || February 29, 2000 || Socorro || LINEAR || — || align=right | 1.7 km || 
|-id=872 bgcolor=#fefefe
| 80872 ||  || — || February 29, 2000 || Socorro || LINEAR || NYS || align=right | 3.5 km || 
|-id=873 bgcolor=#fefefe
| 80873 ||  || — || February 29, 2000 || Socorro || LINEAR || NYS || align=right | 1.5 km || 
|-id=874 bgcolor=#fefefe
| 80874 ||  || — || February 29, 2000 || Socorro || LINEAR || — || align=right | 1.8 km || 
|-id=875 bgcolor=#fefefe
| 80875 ||  || — || February 29, 2000 || Socorro || LINEAR || — || align=right | 2.4 km || 
|-id=876 bgcolor=#E9E9E9
| 80876 ||  || — || February 29, 2000 || Socorro || LINEAR || — || align=right | 2.4 km || 
|-id=877 bgcolor=#fefefe
| 80877 ||  || — || February 29, 2000 || Socorro || LINEAR || MAS || align=right | 1.1 km || 
|-id=878 bgcolor=#E9E9E9
| 80878 ||  || — || February 29, 2000 || Socorro || LINEAR || EUN || align=right | 2.7 km || 
|-id=879 bgcolor=#fefefe
| 80879 ||  || — || February 29, 2000 || Socorro || LINEAR || — || align=right | 1.9 km || 
|-id=880 bgcolor=#E9E9E9
| 80880 ||  || — || February 29, 2000 || Socorro || LINEAR || — || align=right | 2.5 km || 
|-id=881 bgcolor=#fefefe
| 80881 ||  || — || February 29, 2000 || Socorro || LINEAR || NYS || align=right | 1.5 km || 
|-id=882 bgcolor=#fefefe
| 80882 ||  || — || February 29, 2000 || Socorro || LINEAR || NYS || align=right | 1.5 km || 
|-id=883 bgcolor=#E9E9E9
| 80883 ||  || — || February 29, 2000 || Socorro || LINEAR || — || align=right | 2.7 km || 
|-id=884 bgcolor=#E9E9E9
| 80884 ||  || — || February 29, 2000 || Socorro || LINEAR || — || align=right | 4.8 km || 
|-id=885 bgcolor=#fefefe
| 80885 ||  || — || February 29, 2000 || Socorro || LINEAR || NYS || align=right | 1.3 km || 
|-id=886 bgcolor=#E9E9E9
| 80886 ||  || — || February 29, 2000 || Socorro || LINEAR || — || align=right | 2.8 km || 
|-id=887 bgcolor=#E9E9E9
| 80887 ||  || — || February 29, 2000 || Socorro || LINEAR || — || align=right | 2.6 km || 
|-id=888 bgcolor=#E9E9E9
| 80888 ||  || — || February 29, 2000 || Socorro || LINEAR || MRX || align=right | 2.6 km || 
|-id=889 bgcolor=#E9E9E9
| 80889 ||  || — || February 29, 2000 || Socorro || LINEAR || — || align=right | 3.2 km || 
|-id=890 bgcolor=#fefefe
| 80890 ||  || — || February 29, 2000 || Socorro || LINEAR || — || align=right | 2.0 km || 
|-id=891 bgcolor=#fefefe
| 80891 ||  || — || February 29, 2000 || Socorro || LINEAR || V || align=right | 1.2 km || 
|-id=892 bgcolor=#fefefe
| 80892 ||  || — || February 29, 2000 || Socorro || LINEAR || — || align=right | 1.6 km || 
|-id=893 bgcolor=#E9E9E9
| 80893 ||  || — || February 29, 2000 || Socorro || LINEAR || — || align=right | 2.3 km || 
|-id=894 bgcolor=#fefefe
| 80894 ||  || — || February 29, 2000 || Socorro || LINEAR || — || align=right | 1.5 km || 
|-id=895 bgcolor=#fefefe
| 80895 ||  || — || February 29, 2000 || Socorro || LINEAR || — || align=right | 1.3 km || 
|-id=896 bgcolor=#E9E9E9
| 80896 ||  || — || February 29, 2000 || Socorro || LINEAR || — || align=right | 1.7 km || 
|-id=897 bgcolor=#E9E9E9
| 80897 ||  || — || February 29, 2000 || Socorro || LINEAR || — || align=right | 2.4 km || 
|-id=898 bgcolor=#E9E9E9
| 80898 ||  || — || February 29, 2000 || Socorro || LINEAR || — || align=right | 2.1 km || 
|-id=899 bgcolor=#fefefe
| 80899 ||  || — || February 29, 2000 || Socorro || LINEAR || — || align=right | 2.3 km || 
|-id=900 bgcolor=#E9E9E9
| 80900 ||  || — || February 29, 2000 || Socorro || LINEAR || — || align=right | 2.3 km || 
|}

80901–81000 

|-bgcolor=#fefefe
| 80901 ||  || — || February 29, 2000 || Socorro || LINEAR || NYS || align=right | 4.3 km || 
|-id=902 bgcolor=#E9E9E9
| 80902 ||  || — || February 29, 2000 || Socorro || LINEAR || — || align=right | 3.6 km || 
|-id=903 bgcolor=#fefefe
| 80903 ||  || — || February 29, 2000 || Socorro || LINEAR || — || align=right | 2.2 km || 
|-id=904 bgcolor=#E9E9E9
| 80904 ||  || — || February 29, 2000 || Socorro || LINEAR || — || align=right | 4.1 km || 
|-id=905 bgcolor=#E9E9E9
| 80905 ||  || — || February 29, 2000 || Socorro || LINEAR || — || align=right | 1.6 km || 
|-id=906 bgcolor=#fefefe
| 80906 ||  || — || February 29, 2000 || Socorro || LINEAR || — || align=right | 2.6 km || 
|-id=907 bgcolor=#fefefe
| 80907 ||  || — || February 29, 2000 || Socorro || LINEAR || — || align=right | 1.5 km || 
|-id=908 bgcolor=#E9E9E9
| 80908 ||  || — || February 29, 2000 || Socorro || LINEAR || — || align=right | 2.2 km || 
|-id=909 bgcolor=#fefefe
| 80909 ||  || — || February 29, 2000 || Socorro || LINEAR || NYS || align=right | 3.0 km || 
|-id=910 bgcolor=#fefefe
| 80910 ||  || — || February 29, 2000 || Socorro || LINEAR || — || align=right | 1.7 km || 
|-id=911 bgcolor=#E9E9E9
| 80911 ||  || — || February 29, 2000 || Socorro || LINEAR || — || align=right | 2.6 km || 
|-id=912 bgcolor=#E9E9E9
| 80912 ||  || — || February 29, 2000 || Socorro || LINEAR || — || align=right | 2.5 km || 
|-id=913 bgcolor=#E9E9E9
| 80913 ||  || — || February 29, 2000 || Socorro || LINEAR || — || align=right | 2.9 km || 
|-id=914 bgcolor=#fefefe
| 80914 ||  || — || February 29, 2000 || Socorro || LINEAR || MAS || align=right | 1.2 km || 
|-id=915 bgcolor=#fefefe
| 80915 ||  || — || February 29, 2000 || Socorro || LINEAR || NYS || align=right | 2.0 km || 
|-id=916 bgcolor=#fefefe
| 80916 ||  || — || February 29, 2000 || Socorro || LINEAR || — || align=right | 2.9 km || 
|-id=917 bgcolor=#fefefe
| 80917 ||  || — || February 29, 2000 || Socorro || LINEAR || — || align=right | 3.5 km || 
|-id=918 bgcolor=#E9E9E9
| 80918 ||  || — || February 29, 2000 || Socorro || LINEAR || — || align=right | 1.8 km || 
|-id=919 bgcolor=#E9E9E9
| 80919 ||  || — || February 29, 2000 || Socorro || LINEAR || — || align=right | 2.4 km || 
|-id=920 bgcolor=#fefefe
| 80920 ||  || — || February 29, 2000 || Socorro || LINEAR || — || align=right | 1.9 km || 
|-id=921 bgcolor=#fefefe
| 80921 ||  || — || February 29, 2000 || Socorro || LINEAR || FLO || align=right | 2.0 km || 
|-id=922 bgcolor=#E9E9E9
| 80922 ||  || — || February 29, 2000 || Socorro || LINEAR || — || align=right | 2.5 km || 
|-id=923 bgcolor=#E9E9E9
| 80923 ||  || — || February 29, 2000 || Socorro || LINEAR || — || align=right | 2.1 km || 
|-id=924 bgcolor=#fefefe
| 80924 ||  || — || February 29, 2000 || Socorro || LINEAR || — || align=right | 2.2 km || 
|-id=925 bgcolor=#E9E9E9
| 80925 ||  || — || February 29, 2000 || Socorro || LINEAR || — || align=right | 4.9 km || 
|-id=926 bgcolor=#fefefe
| 80926 ||  || — || February 29, 2000 || Socorro || LINEAR || — || align=right | 2.4 km || 
|-id=927 bgcolor=#E9E9E9
| 80927 ||  || — || February 29, 2000 || Socorro || LINEAR || — || align=right | 2.2 km || 
|-id=928 bgcolor=#E9E9E9
| 80928 ||  || — || February 29, 2000 || Socorro || LINEAR || — || align=right | 1.6 km || 
|-id=929 bgcolor=#fefefe
| 80929 ||  || — || February 29, 2000 || Socorro || LINEAR || FLO || align=right | 1.4 km || 
|-id=930 bgcolor=#fefefe
| 80930 ||  || — || February 29, 2000 || Socorro || LINEAR || — || align=right | 2.2 km || 
|-id=931 bgcolor=#fefefe
| 80931 ||  || — || February 29, 2000 || Socorro || LINEAR || NYS || align=right | 2.1 km || 
|-id=932 bgcolor=#E9E9E9
| 80932 ||  || — || February 29, 2000 || Socorro || LINEAR || — || align=right | 2.3 km || 
|-id=933 bgcolor=#E9E9E9
| 80933 ||  || — || February 29, 2000 || Socorro || LINEAR || — || align=right | 3.1 km || 
|-id=934 bgcolor=#fefefe
| 80934 ||  || — || February 28, 2000 || Socorro || LINEAR || — || align=right | 1.7 km || 
|-id=935 bgcolor=#fefefe
| 80935 ||  || — || February 28, 2000 || Socorro || LINEAR || NYS || align=right | 1.8 km || 
|-id=936 bgcolor=#fefefe
| 80936 ||  || — || February 28, 2000 || Socorro || LINEAR || MAS || align=right | 1.3 km || 
|-id=937 bgcolor=#fefefe
| 80937 ||  || — || February 28, 2000 || Socorro || LINEAR || NYS || align=right | 1.8 km || 
|-id=938 bgcolor=#fefefe
| 80938 ||  || — || February 28, 2000 || Socorro || LINEAR || — || align=right | 1.7 km || 
|-id=939 bgcolor=#fefefe
| 80939 ||  || — || February 29, 2000 || Socorro || LINEAR || — || align=right | 1.6 km || 
|-id=940 bgcolor=#fefefe
| 80940 ||  || — || February 29, 2000 || Socorro || LINEAR || — || align=right | 2.1 km || 
|-id=941 bgcolor=#fefefe
| 80941 ||  || — || February 29, 2000 || Socorro || LINEAR || — || align=right | 4.6 km || 
|-id=942 bgcolor=#fefefe
| 80942 ||  || — || February 29, 2000 || Socorro || LINEAR || V || align=right | 1.4 km || 
|-id=943 bgcolor=#fefefe
| 80943 ||  || — || February 27, 2000 || Kitt Peak || Spacewatch || — || align=right | 2.3 km || 
|-id=944 bgcolor=#E9E9E9
| 80944 ||  || — || February 27, 2000 || Kitt Peak || Spacewatch || — || align=right | 3.9 km || 
|-id=945 bgcolor=#fefefe
| 80945 ||  || — || February 28, 2000 || Socorro || LINEAR || — || align=right | 2.0 km || 
|-id=946 bgcolor=#fefefe
| 80946 ||  || — || February 28, 2000 || Socorro || LINEAR || — || align=right | 2.3 km || 
|-id=947 bgcolor=#fefefe
| 80947 ||  || — || February 28, 2000 || Socorro || LINEAR || — || align=right | 1.7 km || 
|-id=948 bgcolor=#fefefe
| 80948 ||  || — || February 29, 2000 || Socorro || LINEAR || — || align=right | 1.6 km || 
|-id=949 bgcolor=#fefefe
| 80949 ||  || — || February 29, 2000 || Socorro || LINEAR || — || align=right | 2.2 km || 
|-id=950 bgcolor=#fefefe
| 80950 ||  || — || February 29, 2000 || Socorro || LINEAR || — || align=right | 2.0 km || 
|-id=951 bgcolor=#fefefe
| 80951 ||  || — || February 29, 2000 || Socorro || LINEAR || — || align=right | 2.1 km || 
|-id=952 bgcolor=#E9E9E9
| 80952 ||  || — || February 29, 2000 || Socorro || LINEAR || — || align=right | 2.3 km || 
|-id=953 bgcolor=#E9E9E9
| 80953 ||  || — || February 29, 2000 || Socorro || LINEAR || — || align=right | 3.4 km || 
|-id=954 bgcolor=#fefefe
| 80954 ||  || — || February 29, 2000 || Socorro || LINEAR || — || align=right | 2.4 km || 
|-id=955 bgcolor=#fefefe
| 80955 ||  || — || February 29, 2000 || Socorro || LINEAR || — || align=right | 3.5 km || 
|-id=956 bgcolor=#E9E9E9
| 80956 ||  || — || February 29, 2000 || Socorro || LINEAR || ADE || align=right | 5.5 km || 
|-id=957 bgcolor=#E9E9E9
| 80957 ||  || — || February 29, 2000 || Socorro || LINEAR || — || align=right | 6.3 km || 
|-id=958 bgcolor=#E9E9E9
| 80958 ||  || — || February 29, 2000 || Socorro || LINEAR || — || align=right | 2.3 km || 
|-id=959 bgcolor=#fefefe
| 80959 ||  || — || February 29, 2000 || Socorro || LINEAR || — || align=right | 4.9 km || 
|-id=960 bgcolor=#E9E9E9
| 80960 ||  || — || February 29, 2000 || Socorro || LINEAR || — || align=right | 2.7 km || 
|-id=961 bgcolor=#E9E9E9
| 80961 ||  || — || February 29, 2000 || Socorro || LINEAR || — || align=right | 1.9 km || 
|-id=962 bgcolor=#fefefe
| 80962 ||  || — || February 28, 2000 || Socorro || LINEAR || — || align=right | 2.0 km || 
|-id=963 bgcolor=#fefefe
| 80963 ||  || — || February 29, 2000 || Socorro || LINEAR || FLO || align=right | 1.7 km || 
|-id=964 bgcolor=#E9E9E9
| 80964 ||  || — || February 29, 2000 || Socorro || LINEAR || BRU || align=right | 4.3 km || 
|-id=965 bgcolor=#E9E9E9
| 80965 ||  || — || February 29, 2000 || Socorro || LINEAR || — || align=right | 1.6 km || 
|-id=966 bgcolor=#fefefe
| 80966 ||  || — || February 29, 2000 || Socorro || LINEAR || NYS || align=right | 2.3 km || 
|-id=967 bgcolor=#fefefe
| 80967 ||  || — || February 29, 2000 || Socorro || LINEAR || — || align=right | 1.5 km || 
|-id=968 bgcolor=#E9E9E9
| 80968 ||  || — || February 29, 2000 || Socorro || LINEAR || EUN || align=right | 3.1 km || 
|-id=969 bgcolor=#fefefe
| 80969 ||  || — || February 29, 2000 || Socorro || LINEAR || — || align=right | 2.3 km || 
|-id=970 bgcolor=#E9E9E9
| 80970 ||  || — || February 29, 2000 || Socorro || LINEAR || — || align=right | 4.5 km || 
|-id=971 bgcolor=#fefefe
| 80971 ||  || — || February 27, 2000 || Kitt Peak || Spacewatch || MAS || align=right | 1.3 km || 
|-id=972 bgcolor=#fefefe
| 80972 ||  || — || February 25, 2000 || Catalina || CSS || — || align=right | 2.0 km || 
|-id=973 bgcolor=#fefefe
| 80973 || 2000 EQ || — || March 3, 2000 || Prescott || P. G. Comba || NYS || align=right | 1.5 km || 
|-id=974 bgcolor=#E9E9E9
| 80974 || 2000 ER || — || March 3, 2000 || Prescott || P. G. Comba || — || align=right | 5.0 km || 
|-id=975 bgcolor=#fefefe
| 80975 ||  || — || March 3, 2000 || Socorro || LINEAR || MAS || align=right | 1.2 km || 
|-id=976 bgcolor=#fefefe
| 80976 ||  || — || March 3, 2000 || Socorro || LINEAR || — || align=right | 2.3 km || 
|-id=977 bgcolor=#fefefe
| 80977 ||  || — || March 3, 2000 || Kitt Peak || Spacewatch || — || align=right | 1.9 km || 
|-id=978 bgcolor=#fefefe
| 80978 ||  || — || March 3, 2000 || Socorro || LINEAR || MAS || align=right | 1.2 km || 
|-id=979 bgcolor=#E9E9E9
| 80979 ||  || — || March 3, 2000 || Socorro || LINEAR || — || align=right | 1.7 km || 
|-id=980 bgcolor=#E9E9E9
| 80980 ||  || — || March 3, 2000 || Socorro || LINEAR || — || align=right | 2.0 km || 
|-id=981 bgcolor=#E9E9E9
| 80981 ||  || — || March 3, 2000 || Socorro || LINEAR || EUN || align=right | 2.5 km || 
|-id=982 bgcolor=#fefefe
| 80982 ||  || — || March 4, 2000 || Socorro || LINEAR || — || align=right | 2.6 km || 
|-id=983 bgcolor=#fefefe
| 80983 ||  || — || March 4, 2000 || Socorro || LINEAR || — || align=right | 1.9 km || 
|-id=984 bgcolor=#fefefe
| 80984 Santomurakami ||  ||  || March 6, 2000 || Kuma Kogen || A. Nakamura || V || align=right | 2.0 km || 
|-id=985 bgcolor=#fefefe
| 80985 ||  || — || March 3, 2000 || Socorro || LINEAR || — || align=right | 2.9 km || 
|-id=986 bgcolor=#E9E9E9
| 80986 ||  || — || March 4, 2000 || Socorro || LINEAR || — || align=right | 2.1 km || 
|-id=987 bgcolor=#E9E9E9
| 80987 ||  || — || March 4, 2000 || Socorro || LINEAR || EUN || align=right | 2.1 km || 
|-id=988 bgcolor=#fefefe
| 80988 ||  || — || March 5, 2000 || Socorro || LINEAR || NYS || align=right | 1.5 km || 
|-id=989 bgcolor=#E9E9E9
| 80989 ||  || — || March 3, 2000 || Kitt Peak || Spacewatch || — || align=right | 1.8 km || 
|-id=990 bgcolor=#E9E9E9
| 80990 ||  || — || March 8, 2000 || Kitt Peak || Spacewatch || — || align=right | 4.2 km || 
|-id=991 bgcolor=#E9E9E9
| 80991 ||  || — || March 8, 2000 || Kitt Peak || Spacewatch || — || align=right | 2.0 km || 
|-id=992 bgcolor=#E9E9E9
| 80992 ||  || — || March 8, 2000 || Kitt Peak || Spacewatch || — || align=right | 2.0 km || 
|-id=993 bgcolor=#fefefe
| 80993 ||  || — || March 7, 2000 || Farpoint || G. Hug || NYS || align=right | 4.5 km || 
|-id=994 bgcolor=#fefefe
| 80994 ||  || — || March 4, 2000 || Socorro || LINEAR || V || align=right | 1.5 km || 
|-id=995 bgcolor=#fefefe
| 80995 ||  || — || March 4, 2000 || Socorro || LINEAR || V || align=right | 1.5 km || 
|-id=996 bgcolor=#E9E9E9
| 80996 ||  || — || March 4, 2000 || Socorro || LINEAR || EUN || align=right | 1.8 km || 
|-id=997 bgcolor=#E9E9E9
| 80997 ||  || — || March 5, 2000 || Socorro || LINEAR || — || align=right | 2.8 km || 
|-id=998 bgcolor=#fefefe
| 80998 ||  || — || March 5, 2000 || Socorro || LINEAR || FLO || align=right | 1.6 km || 
|-id=999 bgcolor=#fefefe
| 80999 ||  || — || March 5, 2000 || Socorro || LINEAR || NYS || align=right | 1.4 km || 
|-id=000 bgcolor=#E9E9E9
| 81000 ||  || — || March 5, 2000 || Socorro || LINEAR || — || align=right | 2.7 km || 
|}

References

External links 
 Discovery Circumstances: Numbered Minor Planets (80001)–(85000) (IAU Minor Planet Center)

0080